Note: Some items are indented one level from the name of a program that are all subsections, topics, or sub-programs of that program.

VTV1 

5 phút thể thao
7 ngày vui sống
22h30
24h công nghệ 
24h sống xanh
60 phút mở
90 phút để hiểu
2 – Tech
Điểm tin 08:00
Góc biếm họa
Kiến tạo
Ký ức
Quốc gia số
Hình ảnh Sự kiện và bình luận
Thời sự 09:00
Từ cuộc sống
Ý bạn thế nào
100 ngày chống dịch COVID-19 
360 độ sạch
1–2–3 Việt Nam
Alo sĩ tử
An toàn giao thông
An toàn lao động
APEC Việt Nam 2006
Ẩm thực đường phố
Âm nhạc & cuộc sống
Âm nhạc giao hưởng thính phòng
Âm nhạc và đời sống
Ấn tượng thể thao 7 ngày
Bài hát còn mãi với tuổi thơ
Bản lĩnh người Việt
Bản sắc Việt Nam
Bản tin 5 phút
Bản tin An toàn giao thông
Bản tin Bất động sản
Bản tin cuối ngày
Bản tin đêm
Bản tin nông nghiệp
Bản tin tài chính
Bản tin thời tiết
Bản tin tiếng Anh – News 
Culture Watch
Bản tin tiếng Pháp – Le Journal
Bản tin Văn hóa – Du lịch
Bản tin Xây dựng bất động sản
Bản tin quốc tế
Báo giờ
Báo chí toàn cảnh
Bài ca đi cùng năm tháng
Bình luận thể thao
Blog giao thông
Giao thông 365 độ
Chuyện đi đường
Lời khuyên sau tay lái
Lăng kính người dân
Ca nhạc
Ca nhạc theo yêu cầu khán giả
Camera công sở
Các vấn đề xã hội
Cải cách hành chính
Cảm nhận Việt Nam
Cảnh báo thiên tai
Cà phê khởi nghiệp
Cặp lá yêu thương
Cận cảnh
Cất cánh
Câu chuyện âm nhạc
Câu chuyện dân số
Câu chuyện quốc tếCâu chuyện từ vùng dịchCâu chuyện văn hóaCâu lạc bộ Hài
Câu lạc bộ người yêu thơCâu lạc bộ thơCâu lạc bộ nghệ thuậtCâu lạc bộ Văn học nghệ thuật
Cây cao bóng cả 
Cha mẹ thay đổi
Chào buổi sáng
Alo
An toàn giao thông
Bản tin giao thông
Cảnh báo hôm nay
Cà phê khởi nghiệp
Bông lúa
Cộng đồng phòng chống thiên tai
Đồng tiền thông thái
Kết nối nông sản
Nông nghiệp sạch
Sao Thần nông – Cho mùa bội thu
Sổ tay nhà nông
Chuyện bốn phương
Chuyện nhà nông 
Cuộc sống không khói thuốc lá 
Dự báo thời tiết
Điểm báo
Điểm đến cuối tuần
Điểm sách
Đường dây nóng
Gặp gỡ cuối tuần
Gõ cửa ngày mới
Hôm nay là ngày gì?
Khách mời buổi sáng
Khởi hành
Khởi nghiệp
Mỗi ngày một cuốn sách
Mỗi ngày một ý tưởng
Ý tưởng 24h
Ý tưởng Việt Nam
Nhà nông làm giàu
Nhân vật buổi sáng
Nông thôn hôm nay
Sao Thần Nông – Cho mùa bội thu
Sự kiện trong tuần
Thể thao(tên cũ là Bản tin thể thao buổi sáng và Tin thể thao)
Thiên tai
Thời tiết Nhìn thế giới
Thời tiết nông vụ
Tin buổi sáng
Tin tức
Điểm báo
Tin tức buổi sáng
Tin tức giao thông
Việt Nam 7 ngày
Việt Nam thức giấc
Xu hướng
Ý tưởng mới
Chân dung văn nghệ sĩChân dung nghệ sỹChân dung Việt NamChiếc nôi và câu hátChiến binh xanhChiến dịch COVID-19Chiến dịch mùa xuânChìa khoá thành côngChính sách – cuộc sốngChính sách kinh tế và cuộc sốngChống buôn lậuChống buôn lậu, hàng giả – Bảo vệ người tiêu dùngChơi với tôi Seasame – Play with me Sesame Chuyên mụcChuyện cổ tíchChuyên mục cuối tuầnChuyên mục văn hóaChuyến xe khởi nghiệpChuyện cổ tích bây giờChuyện công an xãChuyện đô thịChuyện đương thờiChuyện làng quêChuyện ngày thườngChuyện nhà nôngChuyện nhà nông với nông nghiệpChuyện xưa tích cũChuyển động 24h24h cuối tuần24h lạ24h nóng24h sốngCâu chuyện quốc tếCâu chuyện thể thaoCâu chuyện văn hóaCặp lá yêu thươngChuyện những anh hùngChuyện nóngCOVID-19 – Chuyện chưa kểĐi và trải nghiệmĐiểm hẹn 7 ngàyĐiểm nhấn COVID-19Điểm tuần – 24h ReviewGì thế nhỉ? Góc thành phốHãy làm sạch biểnHoa việc tốtKý ức mùa xuânMiền quê đáng sốngNghĩ khác, sống khácNhững anh hùng thế kỷ XXPhòng chống dịch COVID-19Sáng tạo toàn cầuStar 24hThời tiết 24hTiêu điểmTiêu điểm 24h Tin 24sTrang nhất quốc tếTrò chuyện cuối tuần (Talk cuối tuần)Văn hóa thể thao 24hViệc tử tếZLifeChứng khoán cuối tuần  Chương trình Chiếu phim Chương trình thiếu nhiCa nhạc thiếu nhiCâu lạc bộ dễ hay khóĐôi tay khéo léoKể chuyện mẫu giáo  Khoa học vuiThời sự thiếu nhiChương trình tuyên truyềnCKX Coffee Time Con đường âm nhạcCon đường nông sảnCon đường thuốc ViệtCòn lại với thời gianCông đoànCông nghệ và cuộc sốngCông nghệ và đời sốngCổng làng tự truyệnCuộc chiến sinh tửCuộc sống sốCuộc sống thường ngày18:00An ninh trật tựMách bạnBản tin chiềuBản tin nông sảnBản tin Văn hóa - du lịchBí quyết khỏe đẹpBlog giao thôngCâu chuyện cuộc sốngCon số ấn tượngChuyện gì?Của bền tại người Cuộc sống không khói thuốc láCửa và dấuDự báo thời tiếtDự báo thời tiết nông vụĐiểm hẹn văn hóaĐời sống tiêu dùngĐồng hành mùa thiKhách mời cuộc sốngKỹ năng sốngNgày mai tươi sángNông sản từ chất lượng đến thị trườngSổ tay nhà nôngSống khỏeSống ở làngSức khỏe là vàngThị trường 24hThời sự học đườngThời tiết du lịchTiêu dùng thông minhTin trước 7hTin tứcVì Việt Nam xanhCuộc sống vẫn tiếp diễnCuộc thi truyền hìnhCùng em đến trườngCùng lợi ích cộng đồng Cửa sổ ASEANCửa sổ văn họcCựu chiến binh Việt NamDám sốngDanh ngôn bốn phươngDanh ngôn và cuộc sốngDanh nhân đất ViệtDạy tiếng Việt lớp 1 (phát lại từ VTV7)Dạy tiếng Việt lớp 2 (phát lại từ VTV7)Dặm dài đất nước Dân ca nhạc cổDân ca Việt NamDân sốDân số – Vấn đề hôm nayDân số và phát triểnDân tộcDân tộc miền núiDân tộc và phát triểnDi sản văn hóaDiễn đànDiễn đàn doanh nghiệpDiễn đàn nông thônDiễn đàn sân khấuDiễn đàn văn hóa – xã hộiDiễn đàn văn học nghệ thuậtDiễn đàn văn nghệDoanh nhân Việt NamDọc miền đất nướcDòng chảy phương ĐôngDoanh nghiệp – Doanh nhânDoanh nghiệp với trách nhiệm xã hộiDoanh nhân và hội nhậpDòng chảy tài chínhDu ca ViệtDu lịch Việt NamDự báo thời tiếtDự báo thời tiết nông vụĐại đoàn kếtĐại đoàn kết toàn dân tộcĐảng trong cuộc sống hôm nayĐèn giao thôngĐến với bài thơ hayĐi tìm đồng độiĐịa danh sự tíchĐiểm hẹn văn hóaĐiểm tựa tương laiĐộc bản DuoĐối diệnĐối thoại Đối thoại chính sáchĐồng hành Cùng hòa nhịp để làm sạch biển Gặp gỡ Online Gia đình & xã hộiGia đình và trẻ em Giai điệu kết nốiGiai điệu thángGiai điệu tự hào –  Giao hưởng thính phòngGiao lưu văn hóa Việt NhậtGiấc mơ Việt NamGiờ cao điểm Giờ vàng thể thaoGiới thiệu tác phẩm mớiGóc nhìn văn hóaGương sáng quanh taGương sáng trong cuộc sốngHà Nội mùa xuân 79 (chương trình của Đài PT-TH Hà Nội)Hà Nội xưa và nayHải quan Việt NamHành trình 24hHành trình di sảnHành trình hy vọngHành trình khát vọngHành trình theo nhật kýHành trình trở về điểm hẹnHành trình truyền cảm hứngHành trình vẻ đẹpHành trình xanhHào khí ngàn năm Hãy gặp họ đêm nayHiTech Công nghệ tương laiHòa nhạc thính phòngHọc tập và làm theo tấm gương đạo đức Hồ Chí MinhHồ sơHội nhậpHội nhập kinh tế quốc tếHộp thư tổng hợpHộp thư truyền hình KCTKể chuyện với ngườiKể chuyện về NgườiKhám phá thế giớiKhám phá thế giới ComputerKhám phá Việt NamKhát vọng non sôngKhát vọng phát triểnKhát vọng sốngKhát vọng Việt NamKhoảnh khắcKhoảnh khắc bị đánh cắpKhoảnh khắc cuối tuầnKhoảnh khắc thường ngàyKhoảnh khắc thường ngày – Vì cuộc sống xanhKhoa học thường thứcKhoa học vuiKhoa học vui: Quả táo của NewtonKhoa học và cuộc sốngKhoa học và đời sốngKhông gian nghệ thuậtKhông gian nghệ thuật trong thángKhông gian văn hóa nghệ thuậtKhông khoảng cáchKhông mũKhông thể lãng quênKhơi nguồn văn nghệ dân gianKhuyến côngKhuyến nông Kinh doanh & pháp luậtKinh tếKinh tế công nghiệpKinh tế đối ngoại
Kinh tế – Sản xuất tiêu dùng & thị trường 
Kỷ lục Guinness
Ký sự - Hành trình người đi tìm lửa
Ký sự những nẻo đường
Ký sự nước Lào
Ký sự sông Đà
Ký sự Thăng Long
Ký sự vùng cao 
Kỳ thú quanh ta
Ký ức Việt Nam 
Làm giàu không khó
Làm giàu không khó – Đường tới thành công
Làm quen với nghệ sĩ
Làm theo lời Bác
Làng Việt
Lao động và công đoàn
Lao động việc làm
Làng văn hóa
Làng vui chơi, làng ca hát
Lăng kính thông minh
Lục lạc vàng
Lửa thử vàng
Lựa chọn cuối tuần
Ma túy
Ma túy SOS
Made in Vietnam
Mái ấm yêu thương
Mênh mang tình đời
Môi trường
Một địa chỉ văn hóa
Một phút có trong sự thật
Mỗi ngày 1 cuốn sách
Mỗi tuần 1 chuyện
Mỗi tháng một chuyến đi
MV Yêu thích
Năng lượng cho phát triển đất nước
Nét đẹp dân gian
Nẻo về nguồn cội
Ngày mai tươi sáng 
Ngôi sao thuốc Việt
Người đương thời
Người Hà Nội 
Người quê
Người tốt việc tốt
Người xây tổ ấm
Nhà đất hôm nay
Nhà hát truyền hình
Nhà nông đua tài
Nhân đạo
Nhịp cầu nhân ái
Nối trọn yêu thương
Nhận diện
Nhật ký người Việt
Nhìn từ Hà Nội
Nhìn ra thế giới
Nhịp cầu nghề nghiệp
Nhịp cầu thương vụ
Nhịp sống đô thị
Nhịp sống ô tô
Nhớ Người
Những hòn bi lăn
Những lâu đài cổ ở châu Âu 
Như chưa hề có cuộc chia ly - Wait For Me (Zhdi Menya)
Những bông hoa nhỏ
Những bông hoa nhỏ: Hộp màu kỳ diệu
Những bông hoa nhỏ: Khoa học vui
Những bông hoa nhỏ: Quả táo của Newton
Những bông hoa nhỏ: Thời sự thiếu nhi
Những chuyện không tin nhưng có thật
Những đứa trẻ thông thái
Những mảnh ghép của cuộc sống
Những người thích đùa 
Những ước mơ xanh
Nói không với thực phẩm bẩn
Non sông một dải (1975)
Nông nghiệpNông nghiệp 4.0Nông nghiệp mớiNông nghiệp sạchNông nghiệp xanhNông nghiệp xanh – Thực phẩm sạchNông thôn mớiNông thôn ngày nayNơi huyền thoại bắt đầuNước non ngàn dặmÔn tập văn hóaÔn thi đại họcPháp luật kinh doanhPhát huy vai trò của mặt trậnPhát triển vùng Phép màu cuộc sốngPhía sau màn nhungPhim ca nhạcPhim cuối tuầnPhim cổ tích nước ngoàiPhim tài liệuPhim tài liệu nước ngoàiPhim thiếu nhiPhim truyệnPhóng sựPhóng sự điều traPhòng chống bạo lựcPhụ nữ và cuộc sốngPhụ nữ với cuộc sốngQuán thanh xuânQuà tặng cuộc sống Quân độiQuân đội nhân dânQuốc gia khởi nghiệpQuốc gia sốQuốc hội với cử triS – Việt NamSản xuất tiêu dùngSáng tạo khởi nghiệpSân khấuSân khấu mọi miềnSân khấu thiếu nhiSắc màu các dân tộcSắc màu văn hóa dân tộcSiêu thủ lĩnhSinh ra từ làngSống chậmSống mớiĐiểm đến cuối tuầnHành trang vào đờiNhịp sống ô tôSắc màu cuối tuầnThông điệp sức khỏeTiêu điểm giáo dụcStudio 3Sức khỏe cộng đồngSức khỏe là vàngSức sống mớiSự kiện tuần tớiSự kiện và bình luậnHình ảnh và bình luậnHình ảnh Sự kiện và bình luậnSự lựa chọn cho tương laiSự việc và bình luậnSự việc ý kiếnTác giả tác phẩmTác phẩm mớiTại sao Không?Talk VietnamTài chính kinh doanhTài chính tiêu dùng Tạp chí âm nhạc Tạp chí chứng khoánTạp chí khoa học – xã hội – nhân vănTạp chí kinh tếTạp chí kinh tế cuối tuầnTạp chí pháp luật Tạp chí phụ nữTạp chí sức khỏeTạp chí thể thaoTạp chí thể thao châu ÁTạp chí thể thao OlympicTạp chí thiếu nhiTạp chí tiêu dùngTạp chí văn hóaTạp chí văn hóa xã hội Tạp chí bóng đá thế giớiTạp chí dân tộc và phát triểnTạp chí dân tộc miền núiTay hòm chìa khóaThanh âm cuộc sốngThanh niênThanh niên lập nghiệpThanh xuân tươi đẹpThành phố vì hòa bìnhThắp sáng tương laiThăng Long nhân kiệtThầy cô chúng ta đã thay đổiTheo chân BácTheo dòng thời sựThể dục buổi sángThể dục thể thaoThể thaoThế giới 7 ngày quaThế giới 24h chuyển độngGương mặt 24hSáng tạo toàn cầuThế giới thể thaoThế giới đó đâyThế giới động vậtThế giới góc nhìnThế giới hôm nayThế giới kết nốiThế giới ngày nayThế giới thể thaoThế giới trong mắt emThế giới trong ngàyThế giới tuần quaThể dục thể thaoThể thao cuối tuầnThị trường 24hThiên nhiên hoang dãThông điệp thời gianThông điệp từ quá khứThông điệp xanhThời sự 11hCuộc sống không khói thuốc láVì chất lượng cuộc sốngThời sự 12h5 phút hôm nayCảnh báo hôm nayBản tin kinh tếDự báo thời tiếtKhởi nghiệpThích ứng an toànTin thể thaoThời sự 19hAn toàn giao thôngCâu chuyện quốc tếChống tham nhũng, suy thoái, tiêu cựcDân hỏi bộ trưởng trả lờiDự báo thời tiếtCảnh báo thiên tai (Chủ nhật)Dự báo dài hạn (Chủ nhật)Thiên tai & biến đổi khí hậu (Chủ nhật)Hình ảnh ấn tượngHình ảnh từ cuộc sốngHình ảnh và Bình luậnPhóng sự SaoThể thao 24/7Thế giới 7 ngày Thích ứng an toànTin tức - Điểm tin trong ngàyThông tin kinh tếThời sự quốc tếThời sự trong nước tuần quaVấn đề hôm nay (1996-2001)Thời sự học đườngThời tiết du lịchThời tiết này đi đâuThuế và đời sốngThư giãn – Just for Laughs?Thương hiệu quốc gia Việt NamThương mạiThưởng thức truyện ngắnThượng lộ bình anTiếng Anh hội nhậpTiếng nói nhân dân ta 
Tiếng nói phụ nữ
Tiết kiệm điện
Tiêu dùng 24h
Tiêu điểm
Tiêu điểm kinh tế
Tiêu điểm kinh tế trong nước
Tiểu phẩm phòng chống tai nạn cho trẻ em
Tiểu phẩm vuiTìm hiểu ASEM Tìm hiểu pháp luậtTìm hiểu tư tưởng, tấm gương đạo đức Hồ Chí MinhTin bão khẩn cấpTinh hoa nghề ViệtTin nhanh (18h)Tin quốc tếTin thế giớiTin tứcDự báo thời tiếtTin tức đêmTin vắn Tỏa sáng nghị lực ViệtTo hơn – Cao hơn – xa hơnTọa đàmTọa đàm nông nghiệp sạchToàn cảnh quốc tếToàn cảnh thế giớiThế giới 7 ngày quaToán lớp 1 (phát lại từ VTV7)Tổ quốc trong timTôi là nông dânTôi yêu Việt NamTổng hợp thể thao trong nước & quốc tếTrái đất XanhTrái tim cho emTrạm yêu thươngTrang địa phươngTrang thơTrang thơ đất nướcTre xanhTrên đất nước anh emTrên mặt trận chống buôn lậuTrò chuyện âm nhạcTrở về từ ký ứcTruyền hình an ninhTruyền hình công thươngTruyền hình nhân đạoTruyền hình Quân đội nhân dânTuổi cao gương sángTủ sách của chúng tôiTừ những miền quêTừ ý tưởng đến hiện thựcTương lai xanhƯớc mơ Việt NamV – Việt NamVăn bản pháp luậtVăn hoá xã hộiVăn hóa Công an nhân dânVăn hoá Quân đội nhân dân Văn hóa ứng xửVăn hóa ViệtVăn học nghệ thuậtVăn nghệVăn nghệ mẫu giáoVăn nghệ thiếu nhiVăn nghệ với đời sốngVăn nghệ Chủ nhậtVấn đề doanh nghiệpVấn đề doanh nghiệp – doanh nhânVấn đề hôm nay
Vấn đề hôm nay (2)
Về lại cứ địa xưa
Vì chất lượng cuộc sống
Vì người nghèo
Vì tầm vóc Việt
Vì trẻ em
Việc tử tế
Vì an ninh tổ quốc
Vì bình yên cuộc sống
Vì chất lượng cuộc sống Vì chất lượng dân sốVì cộng đồngVì một tương lai xanhVì sự tiến bộ phụ nữViệt Nam vẻ đẹp tiềm ẩnVì quyền lợi người tiêu dùngVì sao lại thếViệt Nam – đất nước – con ngườiViệt Nam hôm nay Cuộc sống không khói thuốc láDự báo thời tiếtĐiểm tinHỏi đáp COVID-19Lời khuyên hôm nayNhân vật hôm nayỞ nhà chống dịchỞ nhà để phòng dịchỞ nơi đóThật và giả Tiêu điểm hôm nayTin tức hôm nay (17:30 và 18:00)Tư vấn mùa thiTư vấn tuyển sinhHình ảnh Sự kiện và bình luậnViệt Nam qua con mắt người nước ngoàiViệt Nam và các chỉ số – VN & INDEXViệt Nam và thế giớiVKT VTV – Bài hát tôi yêuVTV Đặc biệtVTV Travel – Du lịch cùng VTVVTV Trip – Du lịch cùng VTVVừa chơi vừa họcVui cùng bé yêu Vững vàng Việt NamVượt qua đại dịchXây dựng, chỉnh đốn ĐảngXây dựng ĐảngXây dựng nông thôn mới Ý kiến nhân dân
Y tế 24h

VTV2 

7 ngày công nghệ
7 ngày công nghệ (Version 1)
Game Enter (Wednesday)
Không gian IT (Thursday)
Thật đơn giản (Saturday)
Thế giới công nghệ (Friday)
VTV2 Mobile (Tuesday)
Xe và đời sống (Sunday)
Y5 Cafe (Monday)
7 ngày công nghệ (Version 2)
Có thể bạn chưa biết (Saturday)
Công nghệ tiêu dùng (Tuesday)
Không gian IT (Thursday)
Thế giới công nghệ (Friday)
Thế giới nghe nhìn (Wednesday)
Xe và đời sống (Sunday)
Y5 Cafe (Monday)
8 giờ tối thứ 6
23 giờ
Đồng hành cùng 23 giờ
50 bài hát thiếu nhi hay nhất thế kỷ
50 phút thiếu nhi
100 bài hát thiếu nhi hay nhất thế kỷ 20
360 độ Nhật Bản
360 độ thể thao
An ninh và Cuộc sống
An sinh xã hội
An toàn điện cho mọi người
An toàn điện trong nông thôn
An toàn vệ sinh thực phẩm 
Âm nhạc dân gian
Âm nhạc diễn giải
Âm nhạc phổ thôngBản tinBản tin Khoa học giáo dục
Bản tin tiếng Anh, Pháp
Bảo hiểm tiền gửi
Bảo hiểm xã hội
Bạn cần biếtBạn có biếtBạn của nhà nôngBạn nhà nôngBạn trẻ bốn phươngBây giờ và ở đâyBếp ViệtBên con mỗi ngàyBiển đảo quê hươngBình giảng tác phẩm
Bốn mùa yêu thương 
Bổ trợ kiến thức cho học sinh
Bổ trợ kiến thức giáo viên 
Bổ trợ kiến thức văn hóa
Bồi dưỡng kiến thức giáo viên
Bồi dưỡng nghiệp vụ giáo viênCảnh báoCác nền văn minh thế giới Các vấn đề chính trị xã hộiCác vấn đề giáo dụcCác vấn đề xã hộiCái lý cái tìnhCánh cửa mở rộngCắt và uốn các kiểu tóc nam nữCảm nhận Việt NamCẩm nang du lịchCâu chuyện cuối tuầnCâu chuyện giáo dụcCâu chuyện khoa họcCâu chuyện pháp luậtCâu lạc bộ tri thức trẻ
Cầu truyền hình sức khỏe
Câu chuyện sở hữu trí tuệ
Chân trời khoa học
Chất lượng cuộc sống
Chất lượng quốc gia
Chất Việt
Check in Việt Nam
Chìa khóa cuộc sống
Chinh phục đỉnh Everest
Cho muôn đời sau
Cho ngày hoàn hảo
Chuẩn hóa giáo viên mầm nonChuẩn hóa giáo viên tiểu học
Chuyển động 24h (phát song song với VTV1)
Star 24h
24h lạ
24h nóng 
Câu chuyện thể thao  
Cặp lá yêu thương
Chuyện những anh hùng  
Gì thế nhỉ? 
Hãy làm sạch biển
Ký ức mùa xuân
Miền quê đáng sống 
Phòng chống dịch COVID-19 
Thời tiết 24h 
Tin 24s 
Văn hóa thể thao 24h
Việc tử tế
Chúc bé ngủ ngon (sau chuyển sang từ VTV3)
Chuyên đề khoa học
Chuyện làm giàu của nhà nông
Chuyến xe buýt kỳ thú
Chúng tôi & các bạn trên Internet
Click
Cổ sinh học
Chuyện trưa công sở
Công nghệ 360
Công nghệ đời sống 
Công nghệ kiến tạo
Công nghệ thế kỷ 21
Công nghệ và Tiêu dùng
Công nghệ và ứng dụng
Cổng làng tự truyện
Cơ thể bạn nói gì?
COVID-19: Phòng và chống
Cuộc đời là những chuyến đi
Cuộc đua số
Cuộc sống số
Cuộc sống xanh
Cuốn sách của tôi
Cùng bạn chữa bệnh
Cùng em đến trường
Cùng nông dân bàn cách làm giàu
Cùng Petronas khám phá thế giới 
Cùng xem và suy ngẫmDành cho đối tượng vào đại họcDành cho thiếu nhi
Dạy đàn guitar  
Dạy đàn organ trên truyền hình
Dạy hát 
Dạy hát dân ca
Dạy hát tiếng Việt 
Dạy hát truyền hình
Dạy làm đồ chơi 
Dạy mỹ thuật cho học sinh tiểu học
Dạy nghề
Dạy nghề kế toán 
Dạy nghề kế toán trang trại  
Dạy nghề nông nghiệp 
Dạy nghề sửa máy công nghiệp
Dạy nghề sinh vật cảnh
Dạy nghề sửa xe máy 
Dạy nghề truyền thống mây tre đan
Dạy nhạc
Dạy tiếng nước ngoài qua bài hát
Dạy ngoại ngữ trên truyền hình
Dạy ngôn ngữ ký hiệu
Dạy tiếng nước ngoài trên truyền hình
Dạy tiếng Việt lớp 1 (phát lại từ VTV7)
Dạy tiếng Việt lớp 2 (phát lại từ VTV7)
Dạy tin học
Dạy tin học trên truyền hình 
Dạy vẽ    
Dân số và Phát triển
Dân tộc và truyền thống
Disney Club
Dọc miền đất nước 
Dòng chảy phương Đông
Du lịch khám phá
Du lịch qua màn ảnh nhỏ 
Dưới con mắt trẻ thơ
Đánh thức cơ thể
Đất và người miền Trung
Đẹp 24/7
Đèn giao thông
Đến với nghệ thuật thứ 7 
Đến với tri thức khoa học
Đi đâu? Ăn gì?
Đi tìm đồng đội
Điện ảnh kết nối đam mê
Điện ảnh kinh điển
Điện dân dụngĐiểm hẹn văn hóa thế giớiĐốc tờ 4.0Đối thoại
Đồng tiền khôn
Động vật dưới con mắt trẻ thơ
Đường tới nông trại
Game Enter
Gia đình 4.0
Gia đình bạn và tôi
Gia đình và người công dân tí hon
Giá mà biết trước
Giao lưu và đối thoại 
Giao lưu – Toạ đàm
Giao lưu âm thực Việt - Nhật
Giao lưu hàng tháng
Giáo dục công dân
Giáo dục dân sốGiáo dục giới tính Giáo dục mầm nonGiáo dục tiểu họcGiáo dục từ xaGiải đề thi Đại học – Cao đẳng Giải mã cuộc sốngGiải mã văn hóaGiấc mơ hoaGiờ gia đìnhGiờ ra chơiGìn giữ cho muôn đời sauGóc nhìn công thươngGóc nhìn môi trườngGóc sáng tạoGóc thiếu nhiHành tinh xanhHành trình châu ÁHành trình di sảnHãy cùng khám pháHành trình hy vọngHành trình khám pháHành trình khỏe đẹpHành trình sống khỏeHành trình tìm ánh sángHành trình văn hóaHạnh phúc đến mọi nhàHãy chia sẻ cùng chúng tôiHãy cùng khám phá Hiểu đúng bệnh, chứa đúng cáchHọ đang làm gìHoạt cảnh thiếu nhi
Hoạt hình người lớnHọc hát trên truyền hìnhHọc tiếng Trung Quốc Học tiếng Anh qua bài hát  Học tiếng Pháp qua bài hátHọc tiếng Trung Quốc qua bài hátHọc tiếng Nga qua bài hátHồ sơ xét xửHướng dẫn giải đề thi đại học - cao đẳng Hướng dẫn giáo dục trẻ mầm nonHương sắc thiên nhiên 
KCT
Khám phá
Khám phá khoa học
Khám phá thế giới
Khám phá thế giới Computer 
Khám phá văn hóa tộc người
Khám phá Việt Nam
Khát vọng sống
Khéo tay hay làm
Khi trẻ vào bếp
Khỏe 24/7
Khỏe đẹp cho ngày mới
Khỏe thật đơn giản
Khỏe và đẹp
Khoa học – Giáo dục Quốc phòng
Khoa học xã hộiKhoa học xã hội – dân số Khoa học – Xã hội – Nhân văn Khoa học công nghệ nước ngoàiKhoa học công nghệ tuần Khoa học và thực tiễnKhoa học thường thức cho thiếu nhiKhoa học và Cuộc sốngKhoa học và công nghệ trong tuầnKhôn lớn mỗi ngàyKhông bao giờ là quá muộnKhông gian ITKhông gian sốKhởi nghiệp đổi mới sáng tạoKhới sự doanh nghiệp Khuyến làm
Kính vạn hoa
Kiến thức An toàn giao thông 
Kiến thức âm nhạc
Kiến thức cộng đồng
Kiến thức địa phương
Kiến thức khuyến công
Kiến thức môi trườngKiến thức pháp luậtKiến thức phòng chống thiên taiKiến thức sử địaKiến thức thương mạiKiến thức xã hộiKinh doanh dễ hay khó?Kinh doanh va pháp luậtKinh tế sốKinh tế xanhKiot âm nhạcKhảo cổ họcKỹ năng cuộc sốngKỹ năng tham gia giao thôngKỹ năng thoát hiểmKý sựLàm bạn với conLàm quen với khoa học – 10min．ボックスLăng kính của conLần đầu làm mẹLịch sử & Địa lýLựa chọn thông tháiLực sĩ tí honMắt thấy tai ngheMẹ bỉm sữa thông tháiMột thoáng Việt NamMôi trường & cộng đồngMôi trường và cuộc sốngMùa vàngMuôn màu cuộc sốngMười vạn câu hỏi vì saoNăng lượng – Sự chuyển hóa kỳ diệuNăng lượng và cuộc sốngNăng suất chất lượngNét đẹp của tự nhiênNét đẹp cuộc sống
Nẻo về nguồn cội
Nghĩ khác
Nghĩ mở – nói thẳng
Nghiên cứu và ứng dụng
Ngon – sạch 3 miền 
Ngoại ngữ nâng cao 
Ngôi nhà giới tính
Ngôi nhà hạnh phúc 
Ngôn ngữ ký hiệu trên truyền hình
Người nông dân hiện đại
Người phụ nữ hạnh phúc
Người Việt dùng thuốc Việt
Nhà nông cần biết
Nhà nông vui vẻ
Nhà sáng chế – The New Inventors
Nhắn tìm đồng đội
Nhật Bản đồng hành
Nhật Bản ngày nay – Channel Japan
Nhìn ra thế giới
Nhịp cầu khuyến nông
Nhịp cầu VTV2
Nhịp sống công nghệ
Những bông hoa nhỏ
Những nốt nhạc xinh
Vườn cổ tích
Những chàng trai năng động
Những cung điện nổi tiếng thế giới 
Những cuộc phiêu lưu của đá Tiên
Những mảng màu cuộc sống
Những mảnh ghép của cuộc sống
Những miền đất địa đầu 
Những nền văn minh thế giới 
Những nhà vô địch trong thế giới hoang dãNhững người đàn ông tự tinNhững sức mạnh của tự nhiênNhững tác phẩm điện ảnh kinh điểnNhững thành phố cổ kính châu Âu
Những ý tưởng xanh
Nội thất không giới hạn
Nông nghiệp xanh 
Nút bấm
Nữ sinh & Tương lai
Nước non ngàn dặm
Ở nhà mùa dịch
Pháp luậtPháp luật & Cuộc sốngPhát triển bền vữngPhát triển kinh tế năng lượngPhim khoa họcPhim tài liệu khoa giáoPhim tài liệu khoa họcPhim tài liệu môi trườngPhim truyệnPhong tục ViệtPhổ biến kiến thứcHành trình cùng bạn Phổ cập internet Đá FIFA nối mạngPhổ cập tin họcPhụ nữ là để yêu thươngPhụ nữ với nghiên cứu khoa họcQuả chuông nhỏQuà tặng cuộc sốngQuản trị doanh nghiệp Quốc phòng toàn dân Quý hơn vàngRoboconChuyển động cùng RoboconSách hay thay đổi cuộc đời Sạch để khỏeSạch hay bẩn Sáng kiến và Giải phápSáng tạo học tròSắc chỉ hồn ViệtSắc màu các dân tộcSắc màu văn hóa dân tộcSắc màu không gianSân khấu thường thứcSống vuiSổ tay du lịchSổ tay nghệ thuậtSổ tay người yêu nghệ thuậtSống khỏe đời vuiSống khoẻ mỗi ngày (1 - short program)Sống khỏe mỗi ngàySống khỏe mỗi ngày – Số đặc biệtSống như những đóa hoaSống xanh – Ai là chuyên giaSức khỏe cho mọi ngườiSức khỏe cộng đồngSức khỏe và cuộc sốngTạp chí bạn nhà nôngTạp chí công nghệ khám pháTạp chí du lịchTạp chí được chọn
Tạp chí gia đình
Tạp chí giáo dục
Tạp chí khoa học
Tạp chí khoa học nông nghiệp
Tạp chí khoa học xã hộiTạp chí kinh tế nước ngoài
Tạp chí ngôn ngữ & đời sống 
Tạp chí người hướng dẫn du lịch
Tạp chí nông nghiệp
Tạp chí pháp luật
Tạp chí Sử – Địa
Tạp chí sức khỏe 
Tạp chí sức khỏe sinh sản
Tạp chí thiếu nhi
Tạp chí truyền hình
Tạp chí tự động hóa
Tạp chí xã hội
Tạp dề tí hon
Tâm hồn Việt
Thanh niên lập nghiệp
Thay đổi cuộc sống
Thật đơn giản
Thần tượng âm nhạc Việt Nam (đồng hành & công bố kết quả)
Theo dòng lịch sử
Theo yêu cầu bạn xem truyền hình
Thế giới cổ sinh
Thế giới đàn ông
Thể dục theo mùa
Thế giới công nghệ
Thế giới động vật
Thế giới động vật dưới con mắt trẻ thơ
Thế giới nghe nhìn
Thế giới tự nhiên
Thể dục buổi sáng
Thi pháp luậtThi truyền hình
Thiên nhiên kỳ diệu
Thích ứng với thiên nhiên
Thích ứng với tự nhiên 
Thông báo – Ghi ơn
Thông điệp cuộc sống
Thông điệp thời gian
Thông điệp từ quá khứ
Thông tin đơn giản
Thông tin thị trường nông sản
Thời sự (phát lại 21/22h) – Dành cho người khiếm thính 
An toàn giao thông 
Câu chuyện quốc tế
Dân hỏi bộ trưởng trả lời 
Dự báo thời tiết
Hình ảnh ấn tượng
Hình ảnh từ cuộc sống 
Hình ảnh và Bình luận
Phóng sự Sao
Thể thao 24/7 (trước 01/03/2005 là Tin thể thao)
Thông tin kinh tế
Thích ứng an toàn (trước đây là Chống dịch như chống giặc, Đồng lòng chống dịch)
Thời sự quốc tế
Thời sự trong nước tuần qua
Tin thể thao
Vấn đề hôm nay
Thời sự trưa (nay là Thời sự 12:00)
Tin thể thao 
Thời tiết du lịch 
Thức cùng ban mai
Thử thách khoa học
Tìm hiểu nghệ thuậtTìm hiểu pháp luậtTiếng Anh cho người lớnTiếng Anh cho trẻ emTiếng Anh Family Album USA Tiếng Anh thương mạiTiếng Hán thương mạiTiếng Nga thương mại Tiếng Pháp cho người lớn Tiếng Pháp cho trẻ emTiếng Pháp thương mạiTin học Tin học cho mọi người Tinh hoa nghề ViệtTìm hiểu âm nhạc cổ truyền Việt NamTìm hiểu tác phẩm điện ảnhTìm hiểu và hát dân caTìm hiểu về rác và những ảnh hưởng đối với xã hội Tìm kiếm tài năng Việt Nam (công bố kết quả)Tọa đàmToán lớp 1 (phát lại từ VTV7)Top 10 loài động vật – The Most ExtremeTôi là người đồng hànhTrạm kế tiếpTrang bạn gáiTrang nội trợTrên InternetTrò chuyện cùng béTrồng sen lấy hạtTuổi thơ diệu kỳTuổi thơ khám pháTư liệu khoa học Tự nhiên kýTự nhiên ký sựTư vấn tuyển sinhTừ điển tự nhiên họcTừ nhà đến trườngTừ những miền quêTư vấn mùa thi và Ôn thi đại họcƯớc mơ Việt NamVào bếp khó gìVào bếp với những người bạn yêu thíchVăn hóa ứng xử Vẻ đẹp Việt Vì cộng đồngVì cuộc sốngVì sức khỏe người ViệtViệt Nam – Đất nước – Con ngườiViệt Nam trong lòng bè bạnViệt Nam xanhVisa toàn cầuVăn vui vẻ (phát lại từ VTV7)Vì sao lại thếVòng quanh thế giớiVTV – ôn thiVTV dạy học VTV Sports NewsVTV trường họcVui cùng Tweenies Vui khỏe 24/7Xe và đời sống Xe và thời đạiXem và nghĩXung kíchY học bốn phươngY học phương đôngZoom vào cuộc sống VTV3 1–2–3 Việt Nam1 không 2 5 vòng vàng kỳ ảo – 5 Gold Rings6 ô cửa bí ẩn - 9 Windows 7 sắc cầu vồng10 phút10 vạn câu hỏi vì sao12 cá tính lên đường xuyên Việt24 hình/s24h sống xanh30 người 31 chân - 31 Legged Race72 giờ: Thách thức sức bền100 giây rực rỡ – All Together Now100 triệu 1 phút – Million Dollar Minute360 độ thể thao360 độ thể thao: Siêu thị thông tinAi cũng có thể Ai là ai? — Who is Who?Ai là bậc thầy chính hiệu – Who Is The Real Celebrity?Ai là triệu phú – Who Wants To Be a Millionaire & Millionaire Hot Seat Ai thắng đây (from 22.04.2022)
Ai thông minh hơn học sinh lớp 5? – Are You Smarter Than a 5th Grader? 
Ánh sáng hay bóng tối – Heaven or Hell
Ảo thuật siêu phàm – Amazing Magicians 
Âm nhạc
Âm nhạc thính phòng
Âm nhạc và những người bạn
Âm nhạc Việt Nam những chặng đườngẨm thực đường phốẨm thực kỳ thú
Ấn tượng Việt Nam
Ban nhạc Việt – The Band   
Bạn có biết
Bạn có dũng cảm
Bạn đã lớn
Bàn thắng Vàng – Golden Goal 
Bài ca không quên
Bài hát đầu tiên - Big Ben Show
Bài hát hay nhất – Sing My Song
Bài hát Việt
Bài hát yêu thích
Bảng xếp hạng Bài hát yêu thích
Bản đồ ẩm thực Việt Nam
Bản lĩnh nhóc tỳ
Bản thiết kế cuộc sống
Bản tin (phát sóng đến năm 2001)
Bay vào tương lai  
Bánh xe thời gian
Bật mí bí mật
Bé IQ thật giỏi
Bếp Việt
Biển đảo quê hương
Bí kíp giữ thanh xuân
Bí mật của tạo hóa 
Bí quyết của Eva
Bình luận thể thaoBiệt đội siêu nhân nhíBiệt đội vui nhộn – G-Wars
Biệt tài tí hon – Big Star Little Star
Bóng đá là số 1
Bố ơi! Mình đi đâu thế? - Dad! Where Are We Going? 
Bố ơi mẹ thích gì
Bộ ba siêu đẳng 
Bộ tứ 10A8
Bước nhảy hoàn vũ – Dancing with the Stars & VIP Dance
Bước nhảy hoàn vũ nhí - Kids Dancing
Bước nhảy ngàn cân – Dance Your Ass OffCa nhạcCa nhạc quốc tế 
Ca sĩ ẩn danh - Shadow Singer (수상한 가수) 
Ca sĩ tranh tài – Singer Take It All
Cái lý cái tình
Cà phê cùng quý ôngCà phê sángCà phê sáng cuối tuần 
Cà phê sáng với VTV3
Cà phê với VTV3  Cả nhà cùng vuiCamera công sở - Camera Café 
Cảm nhận Việt NamCao thủ đối đầu tranh thủ 
Cặp đôi hoàn hảo – Just the Two of Us 
Cặp đôi hoàn hảo: Trữ tình - Bolero – Duets do Time Symphony  
Câu chuyện thể thao
Câu chuyện từ những bài ca
Câu lạc bộ bạn yêu nhạc
Cầu thủ nhí
Cầu thủ tí hon - Shootdori
Cầu vồng đêm
Cậu bé ngoài hành tinh 
Cây cao bóng cảCẩm nang vàng cho sức khỏeCha mẹ thay đổi
Cháu ơi cháu à – Generation Gap
Chắp cánh thương hiệu
Chân ái
Chân dung cuộc sống
Chất lượng cuộc sống
Chết cười – Anything Goes
Chiếc hộp bí ẩn
Chiếc nón kỳ diệu – Wheel of Fortune
Chiến sĩ 2020  
Chinh phục – Vietnam's Brainiest Kid 
Chinh phục đỉnh cao – Popstar to Operastar 
Chinh phục ước mơ – Catching The Dream
Chị em chúng mình -  
Chọn đâu cho đúng – 
Chọn ngay đi – The Best of All (הטוב מכולם)
Chuyện chàng - chuyện nàng
Chuyện đêm cuối tuầnChuyện đêm muộnChuyện nhà sao
Chuyện ông Đường
Chuyện tối thứ 7
Chúc bé ngủ ngon 
Chúc ngủ ngon
Chúng ta là một gia đình 
Chúng ta là một gia đình (chương trình của VTV6)
Chúng tôi - chiến sĩ 
Chúng tôi là chiến sĩ
Chúng tôi nói về chúng tôi
Chuẩn cơm mẹ nấu – My Mom Cooks Better Than Yours
Chữ V diệu kỳ
Chương trình tổng hợp
Con biết tuốt – Out of Control
Con đã lớn khôn - Hajimete No Otsukai (bản Nhật)
Con đường âm nhạc
Con nhà người ta
Con yêu của mẹ
Còn mãi với thời gian 
Có thể bạn chưa biết
Công dân toàn cầu
Cố lên con yêu – Bet On Your Baby
Cơ hội cho ai - Whose ChanceCùng con trưởng thànhCùng em đến trường
Cùng hát lên nào - Sing On!
Cùng là dũng sĩ
Cùng lợi ích cộng đồng 
Cuộc chiến mỹ vị - Please Take Care of My Refrigerator
Cuộc chiến nuôi con
Cuộc đua không dừng lại (phát lại từ VTV6)
Cuộc đua kỳ thú – The Amazing Race
Cuộc hẹn cuối tuần
Cuộc sống tươi đẹp
Cuộc sống vẫn tiếp diễn 
Cuộc thi tìm hiểu về Hà Nội
Cuộc thi truyền hình
Cuồng nhiệt cùng bóng đá
Cửa sổ thủy tinh
Cư dân thông thái
Danh lam thắng cảnhDanh ngôn bốn phươngDành cho người hâm mộDạy thể thao trên truyền hìnhDặm dài đất nướcDọc miền đất nước Dr.TinDu hành tuổi thơDù bạn ở đâu 
Dư địa chí truyền hình
Dự án số 1 – The DebutDự báo thời tiếtĐã đến lúc hẹn hò
Đại chiến âm nhạc
Đại náo thành Takeshi - Takeshi's Castle
Đại náo thư viện chiến – Silent Library 
Đấu trí – Poker Face 
Đấu trường 100 - Een Tegen 100 & 1 vs 100
Đấu trường siêu Việt - Domination (Israel)Đầu bếp thượng đỉnh - Top Chef Vietnam (from 6.2023)Đẹp Việt
Đèn đom đóm
Để bạn thật sự khỏe mạnh
Đêm tiệc cùng sao – Hollywood Game Night
Đi cùng ước mơ của tôiĐiểm giờ Điều ước thứ 7
Điểm hẹn âm nhạc
Điện ảnh chiều thứ Bảy
Điệp vụ tuyệt mật – Sabotage 
Đoán tuổi như ý – Guess My Age
Đố ai hát được – Sing If You Can
Đối đầu đỉnh cao
Đón mùa mới sang
Đối mặt – La Cible 
Đối thoại trẻ
Đồng hành Bài hát Việt
Đồng hành Lễ hội pháo hoa quốc tế Đà NẵngĐồ Rê MíĐồ Rê Mí MarathonĐồ Rê Mí PhoneĐờn ca tài tửĐứa trẻ thông minh nhấtĐừng để tiền rơi - The Money Drop Đường đến vinh quang  Đường lên đỉnh Olympia 
Đường tới cầu vồng  
Gà đẻ trứng vàng 
Gặp gỡ Đông Tây
Gặp lại để cười 
Gặp nhau cuối tuần
Gala cười
Vui cùng Gala cười
Gặp nhau và cười Gia đình đại chiếnGia đình vui nhộn - Home ImprovementGia đình vui vẻGiai điệu tự hào –  
Giác quan thứ 6
Giải trí với truyền hình
Giai điệu chung đôi - Love at First Song
Giao lưu âm nhạc
Giao lưu gặp gỡ
Giải thưởng Chim Xanh
Giây phút yêu thương
Giọng hát Việt – The Voice (comming soon)
Giọng hát Việt nhí – The Voice Kids
Giọng hát Việt nhí thế hệ mới 
Giờ thứ 9 Giờ thứ 9+Giờ vàng thể thao 
Góc hài hước
Góc nhìn điện ảnhGóc phố muôn màuGóc thiếu nhi
50 phút thiếu nhi
Thế giới hoạt hình  
Trò chuyện với chú chó trắngGóc thư giãnGương mặt thân quen – Your Face Sounds FamiliarGương mặt thân quen nhí – Your Face Sounds Familiar KidsGương mặt thương hiệu – The Face Hạnh phúc là gì?Hai trái tim vàng
Hà Nội 36 phố phường
Hành khách cuối cùng – The Last Passenger
Hành trình 2468km
Hành trình âm nhạc – MTV School Attack
Hành trình di sản
Hành trình Tuổi trẻ làm theo lời Bác
Hành trình văn hoá - ? (Mỹ)  
Hành lý tình yêu – Baggage
Hành trình hạnh phúc
Hành trình thông minh
Hát cùng siêu Chíp
Hát ca bềnh bồng
Hào khí ngàn năm
Hãy chọn giá đúng – The Price is Right 
Hãy yêu nhau đi
Hẹn ngay đi – The Choice 
Học viện IQ 
Học viện mẹ chồng
Hoán đổi – Switched 
Hòa âm Ánh sáng – The Remix
Hôm nay ăn gì?
Hội địa lý quốc gia (1998)Hộp thư âm nhạc Hợp ca tranh tài – Clash of the Choirs Kèo này ai thắng - Fan Pan TaeKhách của VTV3 Khách sạn 5 sao 
Khai thác
Khám phá PanasonicKhám phá thế giớiKhát vọng mặt trờiKhát vọng non sôngKhắc nhập khắc xuất – Show Me The Money (Mỹ) 
Khi đàn ông mang bầu - Man Birth
Khoác áo mới cho tổ ấm
Không gian đẹpKhông gian xanh 
Không giới hạn - Sasuke Việt Nam
Không thể không đẹp 
Không thỏa hiệp – Divided Khoảnh khắc tình yêu - 로맨스 타임 
Khởi động cùng SEA Games  
Khởi nghiệp 
Khởi nghiệp công nghệ 
Khu dân cư rắc rối
Kinh tếKỹ năng sốngKỹ xảo điện ảnhKý ức thể thaoKý ức thời gianKý ức vui vẻ – De Generatie ShowLà nhàLạ lắm à nha - The Wall Song  
Làm sao mới đẹp
Làng vui
Lắng nghe con yêu
Lăng kính thông minh 
Lấp lánh cùng Tide
Lần đầu tiên trên màn ảnh VTV3
Lên hình
Liên hoan dân ca Việt Nam 
Liên hoan tiếng hát truyền hình toàn quốc 
Sao mai
Sao mai điểm hẹnLời tự sựLựa chọn của trái tim – Sexy Beasts
Mái ấm
Magazine Covid – Chuyện hay đánh bay COVID
Mặt trời bé con – Little Big Shots 
Mặt trời tí hon
Mầm xanh
Me xanhMón quà hôm nayMột điều ước
Một địa chỉ văn hóa
Một nửa hoàn mỹ
Một phút có trong sự thậtMột phút và cả cuộc đờiMột vòng Việt Nam
Một trăm ngọn núi 
Mỗi ngày một niềm vui
Ngày của bạn
Ngày chia sẻ
Ngày hạnh phúc
Ngày vui khỏe
Mr và Miss
MTV
 MTV Asia HitList 
MTV - Ca khúc mới
MTV Miền nhiệt đới
MTV - Những bài hát hay nhất trong tuần
MTV theo chủ đề
MTV theo yêu cầu 
Mua sắm thú vị
Muôn màu Showbiz 
MV của tôi
MV Yêu thích
Nào cùng phong cách
Nấu nướng thật là vui
Nét ẩm thực Việt
Nét xanh trong kiến trúc nay
Ngày xưa chill phết 
Nghệ sĩ của đường phố 
Nghệ sĩ tháng
Ngọn lửa tài năng
Ngộ nghĩnh tuổi thơ
Ngôi sao mơ ước 
Ngôi sao thiết kế Việt Nam – Fashion Star 
Ngôi sao Việt – VK Pop Super Star
Người đi xuyên tường – Hole In the Wall
Người đương thời
Người mẫu Việt Nam – Next Top Model
Người một nhà
Người phụ nữ hạnh phúc
Người trong cuộc
Người xây tổ ấm
Nhà bẩn, nhà sạch – How Clean Is Your House
Nhà cười
Nhà đầu tư tài ba – Dollar and Sense 
Nhà nông đua tài
Nhà nông vui vẻ
Nhà thiết kế thời trang Việt Nam – Project Runway
Nhà vô địch (The Champion) - 10 Fight 10
Nhạc sĩ, ca khúc mới 
Nhật ký Hành trình 2468km
Nhật ký Vàng Anh
Nhân tố bí ẩn – The X-Factor 
Nhập gia tùy tục 
Nhịp đập 360 độ thể thao 
Nhịp đập thể thao
Nhịp điệu trẻ
Nhóm nhảy siêu Việt - Vietnam's Best Dance Crew 
Nhớ Người
Những bài hát còn xanh
Những chuyện lạ Việt Nam
Tìm kiếm những kỷ lục Guiness Việt Nam 
Những đứa trẻ tinh nghịch
Những loài động vật trong tương lai 
Những miền đất lạ
Những người bạn ngộ nghĩnh
Những nốt nhạc xanh 
Những phóng viên vui nhộn
Những sắc màu không gian
Những siêu sao hành động
Những tiểu phẩm hài 
Niềm hy vọng vàng  
Niềm tin cuộc sống 
Nốt nhạc tình yêu
Nữ sinh và tương lai
Ô cửa bí mật – Let's Make a Deal
Ô hay, gì thế này? – Trick or True
Ông bố hoàn hảo
Ở nhà chủ nhật - Format thuần Việt và format từ Đức
Ơn giời, cậu đây rồi – Thank God You're Here 
Phép màu sắc đẹp  
Phim tài liệu
Phim truyện
Phim truyện theo yêu cầu 
Phong cách sống
Phóng sự tài liệu 
Phóng sự thể thao
Phụ nữ là số 1
Phụ nữ thế kỷ 21  
Phụ nữ thế kỷ 21 (truyền hình thực tế)
Phụ nữ Việt Nam 
Phút giây thư giãn
Popcorn TV 
Quán âm nhạc
Quà tặng âm nhạc
Quà tặng cuộc sống Quà tặng Music
Quả cầu bí ẩn – 
Quả chuông vàng 
Quân khu số 1
Quyền lực ghế nóng
Quý ông đại chiến – Man O Man
Revive Marathon xuyên Việt
Robocon
Robocon Show
Rubic 8 (2009 - 2018)
Botay.kom
Chuyện hậu trường
Làm giàu cực khó
Phim cuối tuần
Phim truyện
Rubic Chat
Rubic Lăn
Rubic Online
Sitcom
Rung chuông vàng – Golden Bell Challenge
Rung tiếng chuông vàngS – Việt Nam
 Sao phải cười
Sao đại chiến – Celebrity Battle
Sao nhập ngũ
Sáng tạo Việt
Sang trọng Việt Nam 
Sao phải nói thật
Sao phải xoắn
Sáng bừng sức sống
Sân khấu
Sản xuất tiêu dùng
Sàn chiến giọng hát – Singer Auction
Sắc màu âm nhạc
Sắc màu cuộc sống
Sắc màu Nhật Bản
Sắc màu phái đẹp
Sắc màu Showbiz Việt
Sắc màu thời đại
Sắc màu thời gian (The Cover Show)
Sắc màu văn hoá dân tộc 
Săn nhà triệu đô 
Sếp nhí khởi nghiệp – Kiddle Shark
Siêu đầu bếp – Iron Chef
Siêu mẫu Việt Nam
Siêu nhân mẹ – Super Mum
Siêu sao ẩm thực – Crazy Market
Siêu sao Giải ngoại hạng
Sinh ra để tỏa sáng - Born To Shine  
Song ca cùng thần tượng  
Song đấu – Versus
Sóng nước phương Nam 
Sống chậm
Sống đẹp
Sống khỏe mỗi ngày 
Sống ở mỏ
Suối nguồn yêu thương
Sức nước ngàn năm
Sức sống Việt
Sự thay đổi kỳ diệu
Sức sống mới - Cho phụ nữ
SV -  (Nga)
SV 96
SV 2000
SV 2012
SV Show
SV 2016
SV 2020 - 2021
Tài năng SV
Tạp chí MTV
Tam sao thất bản - ? (Thái Lan)
Tạp chí thể thao
Tác giả tác phẩm 
Tác phẩm & dư luận
Tạp chí văn hóa thể thao quốc tế
Tết sum vầy 
Thần tượng âm nhạc nhí - Vietnam Idol Kids
Thần tượng Âm nhạc Việt Nam - Vietnam Idol (from 3.6.2023)
Thần tượng Bolero - Nation Best Voice (UK)
Thần tượng đối thần tượng (The Heroes)
Thế giới âm nhạc
Thế giới hoang dã
Thế giới hôm nay
Thế giới Rap (King of Rap) – Show Me The Money (Hàn Quốc)  
Thế giới thể thao
Thế giới trong ngày
Thế giới ước mơ
Thế kỷ âm nhạc
Thể dục buổi sáng
Thể thao
Cận cảnh thể thao
Pepsi Challenger
Quyền anh quốc tế
Tạp chí cầu lông
Tạp chí thể thao tốc độ
Tạp chí thể thao dưới nước
Tạp chí thể thao tổng hợp
Tổng hợp Champions League
Tổng hợp V-League
Vòng quay bóng đá Việt Nam
Yoga và cuộc sống
Thể thao cập nhật
Thể thao tuần qua  
Thiên đường tuổi thơ
Thiên thần nhí 
Thiên thần nhỏ
Thiếu niên nói – Teenager Said
Thiếu niên toàn năng 
Thông tin 260
Giải lao trúng lớn 
Không gian sống khỏe 
Thương hiệu quốc gia
Thông tin âm nhạc
Thời sự 19h
An toàn giao thông
Câu chuyện quốc tế
Chống tham nhũng, suy thoái, tiêu cực
Dân hỏi bộ trưởng trả lời 
Dự báo thời tiết
Cảnh báo thiên tai (Chủ nhật)
Dự báo dài hạn (Chủ nhật)
Thiên tai & biến đổi khí hậu (Chủ nhật)
Hình ảnh ấn tượng
Hình ảnh từ cuộc sống
Hình ảnh và Bình luận
Phóng sự Sao
Thể thao 24/7
Thích ứng an toàn
Thông tin kinh tế
Thời sự quốc tế
Tin tức - Điểm tin trong ngày 
Vấn đề hôm nay 
Thời sự trưa (nay là Thời sự 12:00 - Phát lại từ VTV2, đến 2001)
Thời tiết này đi đâu
Thời trang và Cuộc sống
Thời trang và đam mê
Thuế và đời sống
Thử tài món ngon
Thư giãn cuối tuần
Bản tin chém chuối
Chém chuối cuối tuần
Copy và bơm vá
Hỏi xoáy đáp xoay
Tiểu phẩm hài 
Thử thách đường phố – Street Fight
Thử thách nhân đôi – Double Dare
Thử thách trốn thoát - Great Escape
Thương vụ bạc tỷ – Shark Tank Vietnam 
Tiền khéo tiền khôn
Tiểu phẩm hài
Tìm hiểu chính sách pháp luật
Tìm hiểu chứng khoán
Tìm hiểu HIV-AIDS
Tìm kiếm Siêu đầu bếp – The Next Iron Chef
Tìm kiếm tài năng châu Á - Asia Got Talent 
Tìm kiếm tài năng Việt Nam – Vietnam's Got Talent
Tìm lại một quá khứ
Tin tức
Tin nhanh thể thao
Tình yêu của tôi 
Tiếp sức – For The Rest Of Your Life / Set For Life 
Toà tuyên án
Tối chủ nhật vui vẻ
Tôi 16 tuổi
Tôi yêu cuộc sống – I love my life
Tôi yêu thể thao – A Question of Sport .
Tôi yêu Việt Nam 
Trà chiều tâm giao
Trái tim cho em
Trạng nguyên nhí
Tranh tài thể thao – Golden Goal (Phần Lan) 
Tre xanh
Trẻ em luôn đúng – The Kids Are All Right
Trên từng cây số (2007 - 2013)
Trên từng cây số 
Trí lực sánh đôi – Body and Brain
Trí tuệ Việt Nam
Trò chơi âm nhạc – The Lyrics Board & Don't Forget The Lyrics  
Trò chơi điện ảnh - 24 hình/s – The Movie Game (Thailand) 
Trò chơi liên tỉnh - Intervilles
Trò chơi trời cho - Red or Black?
Trời sinh một cặp – It Takes 2 
Tuổi đời mênh mông
Từ ánh mắt đến trái tim
Từ sản xuất đến tiêu dùng 
Tường lửa – The Wall 
Tỷ lệ may mắn
Úm ba la: Chuyện của Tấm
Úm ba la ra chữ gì? 
Ước mơ của tôi - The Apprentice 
V - Việt Nam
Vào bếp cùng người nổi tiếng
Vào bếp cùng phái mạnh
Vào bếp là chuyện nhỏ
Văn hóa Sự kiện & Nhân vật
Văn hóa thể thao Công an nhân dân
Văn hóa thể thao Quân đội nhân dân
Văn học nghệ thuật
Văn nghệ Chủ Nhật
Cùng thưởng thức
Đặc sản chủ nhật
Đố phim
Ngày này năm xưa
Những sắc màu văn hóa
Phim Văn nghệ Chủ nhật
Sự kiện tuần tới
Tác giả tác phẩm
Thư giãn
Tin Văn nghệ Chủ nhật
Tôi và chúng ta
Vòng quay 7 ngày 
Văn nghệ cuối tuần
Văn nghệ Quân đội
Vân tay
Vẻ đẹp cuộc sống
Vẻ đẹp phụ nữ á đông
Về âm nhạc - Có thể bạn đã biết 
Về quê
Vitamin chống Covid
Vì an ninh tổ quốc
Vì bạn xứng đáng – You Deserve It
Vì một tương lai xanh
Vì sức khỏe và hạnh phúc của bạn
Vì sức khỏe sinh sản vị thành niên
Với khán giả VTV3
Việc nhỏ mỗi ngày
Việt Nam của tôi
Việt Nam đa sắc
Việt Nam trong tim tôi
VTV - Bài hát tôi yêu
VTV - Những giai điệu đẹp
VTV Travel – Du lịch cùng VTV
Vua đầu bếp – Master Chef
Vua đầu bếp nhí – Master Chef Junior
Vua hài đất Việt
Vua tiếng Việt
Vui 4 phương, cười 8 hướngVui khỏe có íchVui sống mỗi ngàyVũ điệu đam mê – Got To Dance 
Vườn cổ tích 
Vườn ươm mơ ướcVượt ngưỡngVượt thành chiến – Block Out
Vương miện thần kỳ – The Truth Detetor  
Xả xì chét
Xin chào hạnh phúcXuân Hạ Thu Đông, rồi lại XuânXúc tiến thương mại trong nước
Yo! Cùng ước mơ xanh

 VTV4 

60 phút tiếng Anh
Âm nhạc Việt Nam những chặng đường (phát lại)
Bài hát theo yêu cầu khán giả
Biz Việt Nam
Bizline
Cà phê sáng với VTV3 (phát song song với VTV3 – từ 2017 đến 2020)
Chào Việt Nam
Chân dung cuộc sống 
Chìa khóa thành công
Chúng em học hát 
Chúng ta là người Việt
Chương trình tiếng Anh
Chiến binh xanh (phát lại từ VTV6)
Con đường tri thứcCon đường âm nhạc (phát lại từ VTV1/VTV3)
Con lạc cháu hồng
Cổng làng tự truyện
Culture MosaicCuộc đua không dừng lại (phát lại từ VTV6)
Cuộc song vẫn tiếp diễnCuộc sống vẫn tuơi đẹpCửa sổ ASEANDaily BizDành cho đồng bào Việt Nam ở xa tổ quốc 
Dạy tiếng Việt cho trẻ em
Dạy tiếng Việt trên truyền hìnhDân tộc và phát triểnDiễn đàn Việt
Dọc ngang đất nước Du lịch và ẩm thựcĐường tới cầu vồngĐi để trở vềĐiểm báo Việt NamĐiểm hẹn năm châuĐịa danh & sự tích
Đờn ca tài tử cải lương
Expat Living
Fine Cuisine
Gặp gỡ cuối tuần
Gặp gỡ hàng ngày
Gặp gỡ khán giả VTV4
Giai điệu cuộc sống
Giai điệu quê hương Góc nhìnHà Nội của chúng ta
Hàn thử biểu 
Hồ sơ sức khỏe 
Insight into VietnamJust so VietnamKết nối cộng đồngKết nối thể thao tuầnKhám phá Việt NamKiều hối ViệtKý sựKý ức thời gian (other VTV3)
Món ngon nhớ lâuNép đẹp dân gianNghệ thuật và cuộc sống
Ngôi sao võ thuật Việt Nam
Người Việt bốn phương 
Người Việt hàng ViệtNhật ký người ViệtNhững người con tổ quốcNhìn từ Hà NộiNhịp đập Việt NamNhớ NgườiNúi sông bờ cõiPhim cuối tuần Phim tài liệuPhim truyện Qua miền đất nướcS – Việt NamSáng phương Nam (phát song song với VTV9)
Sài Gòn đêm thứ 7Sân khấuSắc màu các dân tộc
Sắc màu văn hóa dân tộcSức sống thể thao Talk VietnamTài chính kinh doanh
Tạp chí cộng đồng
Tạp chí dân tộc
Tạp chí di sảnTạp chí tiếng Nhật – Japan Link (ジャパン リンク)Thanh xuân tươi đẹp (phát lại từ VTV1)
Thắp sáng tương lai
Theo dòng lịch sửThế giới góc nhìnThế giới trẻThế giới tuổi thơThể thao dân tộc
Thể thao tổng hợp Thời sự: Phát sóng bằng Tiếng Việt, tiếng Anh (News), tiếng Pháp (Le Journal), tiếng Nga (Новости) và tiếng Trung (今日越南)Dự báo thời tiếtThị trường và dịch vụThời tiết du lịchTiểu phẩm hàiTin nhanh trong nước 
Tin nhanh quốc tế
Tinh hoa nghề ViệtTinh hoa võ thuậtToàn cảnh kinh tế Việt NamToàn cảnh thế giới (phát lại)Trái tim cho emTrò chơi truyền hình Ai là triệu phúBộ ba siêu đảngChiếc nón kỳ diệu
Chiến sĩ 2020
Chúng tôi – Chiến sĩ
Chúng tôi là chiến sĩ
Cuộc hẹn cuối tuần
Đấu trường 100
Điều ước thứ 7
Đuổi hình bắt chữĐường lên đỉnh OlympiaHãy yêu nhau điNhập gia tùy tụcQuân khu số 1Rung chuông vàng Sàn đấu ngôi saoTrò chơi âm nhạc
Trúc xanhVua tiếng ViệtVui khỏe có íchTường thuậtTừ những miền quêVăn hóa Việt
Văn hóa và hội nhập
Văn học và đời sống
Việc tử tếVietnam A–ZVietnam Discovery
Việt Nam 7 ngày
Việt Nam hôm nay 
Việt Nam ngày nay
Việt Nam trong lòng bè bạn
Việt Nam và thế giớiVui sống mỗi ngày (phát lại từ VTV3)When in VietnamWeek in ReviewXin chào Việt Nam VTV5 An sinh xã hộiAn toàn giao thôngBản tin dân tộcBản tin thể thaoBản tin thị trườngBạn của nhà nôngCash Cab - Xe kỳ thúCận cảnh thể thaoCho ngày hoàn hảoChuyên mục văn hóaChuyện từ chính sáchChương trình tiếng MôngChương trình tiếng DaoChương trình tiếng TháiChương trình tiếng Tày Chương trình tiếng Mường Chương trình tiếng Cao LanChương trình tiếng Sán ChíChương trình tiếng HoaChương trình tiếng Bru – Vân Kiều
Chương trình tiếng H'mông
Chương trình tiếng Êđê
Chương trình tiếng JRai
Chương trình tiếng Ba Na
Chương trình tiếng S'tiêng
Chương trình tiếng K'ho 
Chương trình tiếng Chăm
Chương trình tiếng Khmer
Chương trình tiếng Xơ-đăng
Chương trình tiếng Raglai
Cổng làng tự truyệnCuộc hẹn cuối tuần (phát lại từ VTV3)Dân tộc và phát triểnDanh ngôn và cuộc sốngDự báo thời tiếtĐường lên đỉnh Olympia (phát lại từ VTV3)Đồng hành cùng người lao động
Gia đình vàng
Hành trình cuộc sống
Hành trình di sảnHành trình đất ViệtKhám phá thế giớiKiến thức khuyến côngKý sựKý sự dân tộc
Kỳ nhân trên xứ sương mù
Miền Tây những điểm đếnNẻo về nguồn cộiNép đẹp dân gianNgười nông dân hiện đạiNhật ký người Việt (phát lại từ VTV1)Nhịp sống VTV5Những mảnh ghép của cuộc sốngNông nghiệp xanh Tây NguyênNước non ngàn dặmPhát triển thủy sản bền vững
Phim hoạt hìnhPhim SitcomPhim tài liệuPhim truyệnPhóng sựPhụ nữ ViệtQuà tặng cuộc sốngS - Việt NamSắc màu các dân tộc
Sắc màu văn hóa dân tộc
Sổ tay nội trợSống khỏe mỗi ngàyTạp chí dân tộcThanh xuân tươi đẹp (phát lại từ VTV1)Thể thaoThông tin chính sách & pháp luậtThời sự 19hThời sự VTV5Tiếng hát trong trái tim đồng bàoTiểu phẩm hàiTọa đàmTổ quốc trong tim (phát lại từ VTV1)
Trang văn hóaV – Việt NamViệt Nam đất nước con ngườiVTV5 kết nối VTV5 Southwest An sinh xã hộiBản tin kinh tế – thị trườngBản tin thể thaoBạn của nhà nôngBiển và đảo miền NamChương trình tiếng Khmer – កម្មវិធីភាសាខ្មែរ (Kâmmvĭthi Phéasa Khmêr)Thời tiết nông vụ – អាកាសធាតុតាមរដូវកាល (Akas Chakŏtam Rôduv Kal)Thời sự – ព័ត៏មាន (Pôrtméan)Nhà nông cần biết – កសិករប្បីដឹង (Kăsĕkăr Pbei Dœ̆ng)Chính sách và cuộc sống – គោលនយោបាយនិងជីវភាព (Koŭlôn Yoŭbay nĭng Chiv Phéap)Chương trình nông nghiệp – នាទី​កសិកម្ម (Néati Kăsĕkămm)Chương trình thiếu nhi – នាទី​កុមារ (Néati Kŏmar)Giai điệu phum sóc – ភុមស្រុកមនោរម្យ (Phŭm Srŏk Mônoŭrĕmy)Phim truyện – ភាពយន្តរឿង (Phéap Yônt Rœăng)Dân số và sức khoẻ – សុខភាពសហ​គមន៍ (Sŏkh Phéap Sâhâkômôrn)Văn hoá và giáo dục – វប្បធម៌អប់រំ (Vôpb Thôrm Ábreăm)Xây dựng Nông thôn mới – នាទី​និដ្ទភាព​ថ្មីនៃជនមន (Néati Nĕdt Phéap Thmei Neychôn Môn)Ca nhạc dân tộc – ចម្រៀងបាសាក់ (Châmriĕng Basák)Sân khấu Dù kê – ល្ខោនបាសាក់ (Lkhaôn Basák)Nghệ sĩ và văn hoá – មត៍កសិល្បៈ (Môtâk Sĕlpák)Phim tài liệu – ភាពយន្តឯកសារ (Phéap Yônt Êk Sar)Phóng sự - បទយកការណ៍ (Batyoŭkâr)Cuộc sống nông thôn – ជីរភាពស្រោកស្រែ (Chir Phéap Sraôk Srê)Cuộc sống xung quanh - ជីវភាពគ្រប់ទិសទី (Chiv Phéap Krôbtisti)Ca nhạc – នាទី​សិល្បៈ (Néati Sĕlpák)Ca nhạc theo yêu cầu – នាទីចម្រៀងនិងប្រិយមិត្ត (Néati Châmriêng nĭng Prĕy Mĭtt)Du lịch và khám phá – តឹកដីនិងមនុស្សវៀតណាម (Kœ̆k Dey nĭng Mĕnŭssák Viĕt Nam)Kho tàng nghệ thuật – ដំបូន្មានបុរាណាចារ្យ (Dâmbonméan Pŏranachary)Người tốt việc tốt – មនុស្សល្អការងាល្អ (Mĕnŭssák L'â Kárĕngéa L'â)Chính sách và pháp luật – គោលនយោបាយនិងក្រឹត្យច្បាប់ (Koŭlôn Yoŭbay nĭng Krœ̆ty Chbăb)Trang địa phương – កម្មវិធីនូរនស្សន៍ខេត្ត (Kâmmvĭthi Nuv Nĕssárn Khétt)Dự báo thời tiết – ប្យាករ្យន៏ឧតុនិយម (Pyâkâry ŏtŏnĕyeăm)Bản sắc phum sóc'Dạ khúc BoleroDân tộc và phát triểnDanh ngôn và cuộc sốngDự báo thời tiếtHành trình cuộc sốngNhà nông cần biếtNhững mảnh ghép cuộc sốngNgười nông dân hiện đạiGóc thư giãnKết nối miền TâyKhám phá Việt NamKhám phá thế giớiKhoảng trời tuổi thơKý ức miền Tây Ký sựMiền Tây những điểm đếnPhim tài liệuPhim truyệnPhóng sựQuốc phòng toàn dân quân khu 9Sản vật phương Nam
Sắc màu các dân tộcSống khỏe mỗi ngàySống với thiên nhiênThông tin nông nghiệpThời sự VTV5 Tây Nam Bộ (11h45 và 18h30)Tiếng hát trong trái tim đồng bàoTọa đàmVì nền nông nghiệp bền vữngVăn bản mới – Chính sách mớiÝ kiến Chuyên gia – Sức khỏe VTV5 Central Highland An sinh xã hộiBạn của nhà nôngCash Cab - Xe kỳ thúCho ngày hoàn hảoChính sách và cuộc sốngChuyện nghềChuyện từ chinh sáchChương trình tiếng dân tộcTiếng Ê ĐêTiếng Jrai Tiếng Ba Na Tiếng S'tiêngTiếng Cơ-ho Tiếng ChămTiếng Giẻ TriêngTiếng Xơ ĐăngTiếng Raglai Tiếng Cơ-tu Tiếng Ca Dong Tiếng M'Nông Tiếng Hrê Tiếng Chu-ru Tiếng Chơ-ro Tiếng Bru - Vân KiềuCuộc hẹn cuối tuần (phát lại từ VTV3)Dân tộc và phát triểnDanh ngôn và cuộc sốngDự báo thời tiếtĐường lên đỉnh Olympia (phát lại từ VTV3)Gia đình vàng
Giải mã Việt Nam
Góc nhìn cuộc sống
Hành trình cuộc sốngKhám phá thế giớiKhám phá Việt NamKiến thức khuyến côngKhoảng trời tuổi thơKiến thức & cuộc sống Ký sựMảnh ghép cuộc sốngNhững mảnh ghép cuộc sốngNgười nông dân hiện đạiNhịp sống VTV5Nông nghiệp xanh Tây NguyênPhát triển thủy sản bền vững
Phim hoạt hìnhPhim tài liệuPhim truyệnPhóng sựPhong tục Việt
Phụ nữ Việt
Sắc màu các dân tộc
Sổ tay nội trợSống khỏe 360Sống khỏe mỗi ngàyThanh âm ViệtThời sự VTV5 Tây NguyênTọa đàmTrang văn hóaV – Việt NamVTV5 Tây Nguyên kết nốiVì nông nghiệp xanh Tây NguyênVTV Cần ThơBản tin An ninh trật tựBản tin nông nghiệpBản tin thể thaoBản tình ca dĩ vãngBiến đổi khí hậuBước chân hai thế hệCa nhạcCâu chuyện nhà nôngChat cùng thần tượngChiến thắng Internet - Beat the InternetChuyện Bác Ba Phi
Đối thoại
Hàng Việt tốt
Hành trình cuộc sống
Kết nối thể thao tuầnKết nối y tếKhi chồng tui vào bếpKinh tế đồng bằngKý sựKý ức Miền TâyLa bàn khởi nghiệpNhịp cầu nông nghiệpNông nghiệp 4.0Miền Tây hôm nayMiền Tây năng độngPhim truyệnQuốc phòng toàn dân Quân khu 9Thời sự (19h)Hình ảnh từ cuộc sốngThám tử kể chuyệnThương nhớ miền TâyTọa đàmVề đất phương NamVì bình yên cuộc sốngVì nước vì dânXổ số kiến thiết VTV7 

 1 2 3 ta cùng đếm5 ký hiệu ngôn ngữ mỗi ngày 5 từ mới tiếng Anh mỗi ngày5 ngôn ngữ ký hiệu
8 IELTS
10 phút khoa học
10 phút sinh thái
 ABC vui từng giờ
Alo English
Alo sĩ tửAn toàn trên mạngBaby on the wayBản tin giáo dục
Bài học làm ngườiBay lên những ước mơBiệt đội BichiliBong bóng và 7 câu hỏi địa lý
Bộ đôi vui nhộn
Cha mẹ thay đổi
 Chinh phục kỳ thi
Chinh phục kỳ thi THPT quốc gia 
Chinh phục kỳ thi vào lớp 10Chung tayChuyện học tròChuyện kể của những chú cừu Chuyện trường tôiChuyến xe hạt vừngChôm chôm và những người bạn
Cùng lăn vào bếp
Cùng nhau ta vận độngCùng nói tiếng HànCon đường nghề nghiệp
Cơ thể tớ là của tớ
 Crack' em upCùng tỏa sáng
Cuốn sách của em
Cuốn sách của tôiDạy học trên truyền hìnhDạy tiếng Việt lớp 1Dạy tiếng Việt lớp 2Đẹp hơn mỗi ngàyĐổi mới sáng tạo
Đường đến trường 
EDU Talk
Em yêu Việt NamEnglish for a MinuteFollow usGiai điệu cuộc sống
Gõ cửa nghề nghiệpHành trình làm mẹHeo đất
Hè vui khỏe
Hiệu trưởng thay đổiHọc đường không khói thuốc Học cùng con
Học lịch sử thật tuyệt
 Học vẽ cùng Ếch CốmHọc mà chơi – chơi mà học 
Học lịch sử thật tuyệt
Học sao cho tốtHọc thông qua chơiHọc tiếng Anh qua bài hátHôm nay chơi gìIELTS Face – OffJumping with TOEICKết nối nhà trường và doanh nghiệp
Khám phá Hồng Kông: Những nhà thám hiểm nhí
Khám phá khoa học – Những thí nghiệm khổng lồ (Discover Science)
Khám phá tự nhiênKhông thì thầmKids speaking EnglishKỹ năng an toàn cho béLà la láLăng kính tự nhiênLớn cùng conLớn lên em muốn làm gìLớp học cầu vồngMagic PhonicsMath DormMẹ kể bé nghe – Những câu chuyện nuôi dưỡng tâm hồnMẹ ơi tại saoMột vòng tiếng ViệtNgày xưa cổ tíchNgười truyền cảm hứngNhớ nhớ quên quênNhững điệp viên nhí siêu hạng 
Những ngôi trường mơ ướcNhững người bạn cầu vồngÔ cửa khoa họcỞ nhà mùa dịchPhim hoạt hìnhPhim khai thácPhim khoa họcPlayer Select
Phóng viên cấp 1
Sáng tạo 102Sơ đồ tư duy Việt NamSiêu tính nhẩm
Sing to learnStream toán họcThầy cô chúng ta đã thay đổi
The Debaters
Thế giới diệu kỳThế giới động vậtThế giới quanh ta
Thử thách khoa họcThức dậy cùng VTV77 phút cho bữa sángBạn là hình gìCùng nhún nhảyThời tiết của béTiếng Anh lớp 1 vuiTiếng Anh lớp 2 vuiToán học diệu kỳToán lớp 1Toán lớp 2Tiến về phía trước
Trên đường đổi mới
Trường học mở A0
Trường Teen
Ú òa
Word on the street – Tiếng Anh thường ngày
Văn vui vẻXứ sở cầu vồngXưởng thiết kế mộng mơ

 VTV8 

365biz
1001 chuyện hôn nhân
Alo 888Alo đô thịAtlas Miền Trung
Ấm áp cơm nhà 
Ẩm thực hình chữ SBác sĩ của bạnBác sĩ tư vấnBàn tròn cảnh giác
Bạn muốn hẹn hòBảo vệ rừng Bất động sản an toànBếp nhàBộ ba hoàn hảo
Bốn phương tám hướng Bước chân khám pháCamera 8 
Camera V8Cà phê TámCash Cab - Xe kỳ thúCẩm nang làm đẹp
Câu lạc bộ bỉm sữa
Chào buổi sáng (phát song song với VTV1)
Chào ngày mới
Chào ngày mới Miền Trung – Tây NguyênChất lượng cuộc sốngChém gió – Gió chémChiến thắng Internet - Beat the InternetChuyện làng
Chuyến xe buýt kỳ thú
Chuyện biển chuyện người 
Chương trình khai thác
Con đường di sảnCông dân và pháp luậtCông lý mở
Cuộc sống hôm nay
Cùng ngư dân vươn khơi
Cười mười thang thuốc bổ
Dân số & Phát triểnDự báo thời tiếtĐại biểu với cử triĐẳng cấp quý cô
Đằng sau những cung đường
Đầu tư 24/7Đi để đếnĐiện ảnh chiều thứ bảy
Điện ảnh cuối tuần
Đối thoại
Đối thoại chính sáchĐồng tiền thông minhGặp gỡ cuối tuầnGia đình hoà thuậnGia đình siêu nhânGiao lộ thời gianGiao thông an toànGiờ chơi đến rồi
Giờ gia đình  
Bác sĩ gia đình 
Hạnh phúc là sẻ chia 
Mẹ và bé
Khỏe và đẹp
Việc nhà
Xe và gia đình
Góc bếp quê nhà
Góc khuất hôn nhân
Hành trình khám phá
Hộp thư truyền hình
Hương rừng Kết nối để bứt pháKết nối miền Trung
Kết nối thị trường lao độngKhám phá thế giớiKhám phá Việt Nam
Khỏe đẹp mỗi ngày
Khỏe vui Kinh tế đầu tưKinh tế đầu tư 24/7
Kinh tế đô thị miền Trung
Kinh tế thị trường
Kinh tế xã hội Miền Trung
Kỳ bí miền TrungKỹ năng thoát hiểmLối raLời trái timMặt trận 389Miền Trung – Tây Nguyên 24/7
Món ngon mỗi ngày
Mỹ nhân hành độngNăng lượng xanhNâng cánh ước mơ
Nẻo về nguồn cội
Nét đẹp cuộc sống
Ngày mới tươi đẹp
Ngôi nhà tôi yêuNgười nông dân hiện đạiNhịp sóng
Nhịp sống miền Trung
Nhìn thẳng
Nói không với thực phẩm bẩnNóng cùng V8 
Muôn màu cuộc sốngOnline 24hỐng kính an ninhTiêu điểmNông nghiệp thông minhOnline 24hÔ kìa ông chủ 
Phiếu bé ngoan Phát hiện và điều traPhía sau tay láiPhong cách và cuộc sống Phóng sựPhố tài chínhQuà tăng cuộc sốngQuyến rũ Việt Nam 
Sân khấu
Sắc màu các dân tộc
Showbiz 24H
Sống có chấtSống có chất (2)Sống xanhSự sống diệu kỳTám cùng bạnTám lạng nửa cânTâm sáng vươn xaTây Nguyên hôm nayTạp chí cuộc sống 
Thần nông vi hành
Theo dòng thời sự
Thế giới 24h
Thế giới 7 ngày
Thế giới tuần qua
Thoát khỏi cạm bẫy
Thông điệp y tế – Sức khỏeThời sự VTV8Thời tiết biểnThời tiết du lịch
Thư về miền Trung
Tin nóng COVID-19
Tin sáng VTV8
Tin cuối ngày 
Tin tức
Tìm kiếm tài năng Âm nhạc Miền TrungTình ca bất hủTinh hoa nghề ViệtTọa đàmTôi chọn Việt Nam  
Tôi có thể - I Can Do That
Tôi là nông dân
Trăm năm trồng ngườiTrên những cung đườngTuyệt chiêu sống khỏeTự hào miền TrungTừ những miền quêTứ phương tám hướngTư vấn sức khỏeTư vấn tiêu dùngVitamin cười Vì an ninh tổ quốcVì an toàn sức khỏeViệt Nam chiến thắngVì hạnh phúc cộng đồngVợ chòng sonVTV8 SpecialVụ án ngay bên bạnVươn khơi bám biển Xe và gia đìnhXóm nợXóm trọ độc nhất vô nhịXung kích Ý Đảng lòng dân VTV9 2 idol4 mùa yêu thương5 phút sống khoẻ7 ngày chứng khoán 7 ngày thể thao7 ngày vui sống8 lạng nửa cân8 xi nê9 phút giao thông9 phút tiêu dùng9 tin9 tin – Tin nhanh12 cá tính lên đường xuyên Việt30 phút với nhạc sĩ40 độ C60 phút rực rỡ365 ngày vui365biz1001 chuyện támẢo thậtẢo thuậtAi cũng bật cườiAi rành 6 câuAi tỏa sángÁo trắng đến trườngĂn vặt Miền TâyẨm thực cuối tuầnẨm thực đường phốẤn tượng Thái LanÂm nhạc & bước nhảy Âm nhạc & cuộc sống  Bác sĩ của mọi nhà Báo chí sự kiệnBáu vật đại dươngBay bổng phương Nam Bàn tròn VTV9Bản tin an toàn giao thông   Bản tin chứng khoánBản tin cuối ngày Bản tin khuya Bản tin kinh tếBản tin thời sự Bạn có tự tin trở thành người mẫu khôngBa lô xoay – Đi một ngày đàngBạn có bình thường ? – Are You NormalBất động sản 24hBếp quêBí kíp để hạnh phúcBí mật món ngon Bí mật người nổi tiếngBí mật thế kỷBí quyết phong cáchBiệt đội tất tần tậtBlog đối thoại (?)Bốn phương kỳ cục ánBước chân ViệtCa nhạcCamera 247Cà phê sángCà phê cườiCà phê tử tếCa nhạc quốc tếCa nhạc thiếu nhi Canh tác bền vữngCanh tác thông minhCao ốc ảo diệu Cận cảnhCâu chuyện đời tôiCâu chuyện ước mơCâu chuyện văn hóaCâu lạc bộ phụ nữCẩm nang cuộc sốngCẩm nang đẹp & khỏe Cẩm nang gia đìnhCẩm nang sức khỏeCâu chuyện âm nhạcCâu chuyện cuối tuầnCâu chuyện cuộc đời Cây khỏe – nhà nông khỏeCây thuốc quý quanh taCEO ExchangeChào buổi sáng (phát song song/tiếp sóng với VTV1 lúc 05:25, 05:30 hoặc 06:00)Chat cùng ngôi saoChat với ngôi saoChăm sóc hậu COVIDChắp cánh ước mơChất lượng sốngChíp bông & Bi nhôngCho mùa bội thuChống buôn lậu, hàng giả – Bảo vệ người tiêu dùngChợ khéo cơm ngonChung tay kết nốiChuyện Bác Ba Phi xưa và nayChuyện của saoChuyện cuối tuầnChuyện cũ dấu xưaChuyện phố phườngChuyến xe sức khỏeChuyển động đa chiềuChuyện chất lượng công trình xây dựngChuyện của chúng em Chuyện đêm khuyaChuyện đời chuyện nghềChuyện đời thườngChuyện gia đình vàngChuyện không thể ngờChuyện thật như đùaChuyện trần gianChuyện từ những con đườngChứng khoán ảoChương trình 6:00Chương trình 6:30Chương trình 11:30Chứng khoán cuối tuầnChương trình 18:30Sống thân thiện với môi trường Có yêu nói đi ngại gìCon đến từ hành tinh nào – Oh My Baby (Hàn Quốc) Con đường ánh sáng Con đường tri thứcCon số vui nhộn – Attention à la marche Cơm ấm nhà mìnhCùng lên tiếngCùng khỏe cùng đẹpCuộc đua kỳ thúCuộc sống – Góc nhìnCuộc sống bốn phương Cuộc sống tôi yêuCuộc sống tươi đẹp Cư dân phố thị Cười 10 thang thuốc bổCười để ngẫmCười vui lắmDạ khúcDạo quanh thị trườngDấu ấnDân ca Nam BộDân ca nhạc cổDấu ấn tình ngườiDiễn đàn làm đẹpDiễn đàn nhà và đấtDiễn viên bá đạoDinh dưỡng cho cuộc sốngDò sóng... cườiDọc đường đen trắngDoanh nghiệp cuối tuầnDoanh nghiệp hôm nayDoanh nghiệp và thị trườngDoanh nghiệp & thương hiệuDoanh nhân Việt Dr You – Sức khỏe cho mọi nhàDu lịchDu lịch phương NamDu lịch ViệtDự báo thời tiếtDuyên phậnĐàn ông nói Đặc sắc Phim VTV9Đất phương NamĐấu giá ngượcĐấu trường 100Đấu trường ẩm thựcĐấu trường ẩm thực nhíĐêm Sài GònĐi để trở vềĐỉnh của đỉnhĐi tìm kho báu – Play 2 Win (Malaysia)Đi Việt Nam điĐiểm đến cuối tuầnĐiều con muốn nóiĐiện ảnh cuối tuầnĐố ba biết mẹ đang nghĩ gì?Đô thị thông minhĐối thoạiĐồng hành cùng người lao độngĐồng hành cùng VTV9Đồng thoạiĐời nghệ sĩĐứa em thừa kếGặp nhau để cườiGhét của nào trời cho của nấyGiải mã sắc đẹpGia đình hết sảyGia đình hoàn mỹGia đình hoàn mỹ (2)Gia đình hòa thuậnGia đình siêu nhânGiai điệu bí ẩn – Karaoke ShowdownGiai điệu phương NamGiai điệu tuổi thơGiải mã sắc đẹpGiấc mơ điện ảnhGiờ rung chuôngGiúp bé lớn khôn mỗi ngàyGõ cửa trái rimGóc khuất hôn nhânGóc nhìn đa chiềuGóc nhìn tài chínhGóc nhỏ Sài GònGót hồngGương mặtGương mặt Người mẫu Việt Nam – The Face Vietnam Gương mặt Showbiz Gương mặt vàngHãy xem tôi diễnHành trình bất ngờHạt giống tâm hồnHát cho dân tôi ngheHiến tài – Hái tiềnHọc làm cha mẹHoa đời thườngHóa đơn may mắn – Give me that billHoa hậu Việt NamHọ đã sống như thếHoa hậu Việt Nam 2018 (truyền hình thực tế)Hòa điệu đất chín rồng Hoa khôi áo dài Việt Nam – Đường tới vương miện Hoa hậu thế giớiHộp vàngHổng cần đàn ôngHồ sơ doanh nghiệp Hồ sơ tình án Hương tình yêuHương vị sốngHương vị ViệtKẻ thứ 3Kết nối hàng ViệtKết nối miền TâyChuyện hai lúaChuyện nắng mưaNgon bá chấyKhám pháKhám phá – Trải nghiệm du lịch Hàn Quốc Khám phá 30 phútKhám phá chữ Việt – BrainTeaserKhám phá miền TâyKhám phá phương NamKhi các thánh xa nhàKhi mẹ ra tay
Khỏe đẹp tế bào
Khoảnh khắc miền thùy dương
Khoảnh khắc vàng
Không gian tôi yêu
Không gian Việt
Kiến trúc xây dựng 
Kim chi cà pháo
Kinh tế
Kinh tế kết nối
Kinh tế số 
Kinh tế tài chính
Kỳ án đời thường 
Làng cười cười cả làng
Lắm người nhiều ma
Lăng kính thời trang
Lần đầu tôi kể
Lập trình trái tim
Lật tranh tìm chữ
Lời xin lỗi diệu kỳ
Luôn có cách để yêu thương
Mắt nai
Mảnh ghép hoàn hảo
Mảnh ghép tình yêu (coming soon)
Mẹ
Mẹ tuyệt vời nhất
Mẹo hay cho bạn
Mekong dấu ấn con đường
Miền đất phương Nam
Miền Tây muôn nẻo chợ
Miền Tây quê tôi
Miền thùy dương cát trắng
Món ngon Phương Nam
Mỗi ngày một chuyện
Mỗi tuần mỗi chuyện
Một chuyến phiêu lưu
Mỗi tuần 1 chuyện vui
Một bước để chiến thắng
Một giờ mỗi ngày
Mơ đi
Muôn màu cuộc sống
Muôn màu Showbiz
Mùa vàng bội thu
MV của bạn 
Năng động phương Nam
Năng động Thành phố trẻ
Năng động vùng đất phương Nam
Năng lượng cho cuộc sống
Nắng – Mưa
Nâng tầm tôm Việt
Nếu là bạn
Ngân nga tại gia 
Nghe cầu vồng nói
Nghĩ – Buồn – Cười
Nghĩa tình phương Nam
Ngon bá chấy
Ngốc ơi là ngốc!
Ngôi nhà teen ám
Ngôi sao ca nhạc
Ngôi sao thời trang
Nguy cơ đầu tiên
Người đẹp nhân ái
Người đứng thẳng
Người mẫu nhí – Model Kid Vietnam
Người mẫu Việt Nam – Next Top Model
Người Phương Nam
Người thành phố
Người tử tế
Nha khoa kỹ thuật cao
Nha Trang biển gọi
Nhà đất cuối tuần
Nhà là nơi để về
Nhà và Đất
Nhạc phụ lắm chiêu 
Nhan sắc mới – Khởi đầu mới 
Nhà thiết kế tương lai nhí 
Nhảy cùng âm nhạc bước nhảy
Nhật ký hành trình 
Nhịp cầu nhân ái
Nhịp điệu Teen
Nhịp điệu trẻ
Nhịp Sài Gòn
Nhịp sống
Nhìn ra thế giới
Nói không với thực phẩm bẩm
Như chia hề có cuộc chia ly
Những bản tình ca
Những cô cậu ô mai
Những cô nàng rắc rối 
Những giấc mơ hồng
Những nẻo đường quê hương
Những bông hoa trên tuyến lửa 
Những câu chuyện đời thường
Những cung bậc cảm xúc
Những miền đất kỳ thú
Những tình khúc bất hủ
Những trái tim nhảy nhót
Những ước mơ xanh
Ninh Thuận xanh 
Nơi ta trưởng thành
Nuôi trồng hiện đại
Oan gia bùm chéo
Olympic Series: Con đường tới vinh quang 
Ở nhà với ông Tám 
Phản ứng đầu tiên
Phản ứng nhanh
Phim điện ảnh nước ngoài
Phim truyện
Phong cách đàn ông
Phong cách phái đẹp
Phong cách trẻ 
Phong cách trẻ
Phóng sự
Phóng sự điều tra
Phổ biến kiến thức 
Phút tám 9
Phụ nữ & cuộc sống
Phù thủy hạt đậu
Quà tặng cuộc sống
Quà tặng tình yêu
Quả cầu thông thái 
Quán trọ ven đường 
Quẳng gánh lo đi
Quốc phòng toàn dân
Ra đồng
Rong ruổi đất Phương Nam
Rung chuông vàng
Sài Gòn – TPHCM xưa và nay
Sài Gòn đêm thứ 7
Sàn đấu danh hài
Sân khấu hài 
Sàn đấu ngôi sao
Sao Việt toàn năng – Soapstar Superstar
Sáng phương Nam
Bản tin thể thao
Cà phê sáng
Câu hỏi tương tác
Chuyện phố phường 
Có gì hay
Dự báo thời tiết
Đường dây nóng số 9
Giao thông – Đô thị
Góc phương Nam
Góc văn hóa
Khách mời
Khỏe đẹp mỗi ngày
Mua & bán
Thời tiết hôm nay
Thư giãn cuối tuần
Tin tức 
Sáng phương Nam cuối tuần 
Sắc màu âm nhạc
Sắc màu văn hóa
Sắc màu VTV9
 Sân khấu thiếu nhi
Siêu mẫu nhí
Siêu nhân Xanh – Vì môi trường xanh
Siêu sao mờ ám
Siêu thần tượng nhí 
Siêu thị việc làm 
Sợi dây tình yêu 
Sol vàng
Sóc nâu kể chuyện
Sống có chất
Sống đẹp  
Sống khỏe
Sống khỏe sống vui
Sống ở Sài Gòn 
Sống với thiên nhiên
Sứ mệnh của cuộc đời
Sứ mệnh đàn ông 
Sức khỏe cộng đồng
Sức khỏe là vàng
Sức khỏe trong tầm tay
Sức sống đồng bằng
Tam nông
Tám công sở
Tài chính tiêu dùng
Tài năng DJ
Tạp chí du lịch 
Tạp chí nông nghiệp
Tạp chí sống đẹp
Tạp chí thể thao
Tạp chí tiêu dùng 
Tạp chí thiếu nhi
Tạp chí tiêu dùng
Tấm thẻ sẻ chia
Thanh xuân gia đình
Thắp sáng niềm tin
Thăng hoa cùng âm nhạc
Thẩm mỹ gia đình
Thẩm mỹ văn minh
Thần tượng Âm nhạc Việt Nam
Thần tượng đột kích – MTV School Attack
Thầy thuốc của bạn
Theo dấu thần tượng 
Thế giới cập nhật
Thế giới hôm nay
Thế giới muôn màu
Thế giới nghề nghiệp
Thế giới nhà đất
Thế giới nhà và đất
Thế giới quanh ta
Thế giới số
Thế giới thể thao
Thế giới Zoom
Thêm niềm mơ ước
Thị trường 24G
Thông điệp Trường Sa
Thông tin thương mại và đầu tư
Thời sự Bình luận
Thời trang & cuộc sống
Thời trang phong cách trẻ
Thời trang và đam mê
Thủy sản & hội nhập
Thuận vợ thuận chồng 
Thuốc Việt tại sao không
Thực phẩm và sức khỏe
Tiếng hát người chiến sĩ
Tiếng tơ đồng
Tiết kiệm điện
Tiêu dùng hàng Việt
Tiêu dùng thông minh
Tiêu điểm thị trường 
Tiếp sức những ước mơ
Tiệm bánh hoàng tử bé
Tin 9 sao
Tin Headline
Tin nhanh – 24h News
Tin tức cuối ngày
Tin tức
Tin tức: Bản tin thể thao
Tin tức: Dự báo thời tiết
Tin tức: Khách mời
Tin tức: Kinh tế 
Tin tức: Tư vấn tiêu dùng 
Tinh hoa nghề Việt 
Tinh hoa nhạc Việt
Tìm kiếm tài năng Anh Quốc
Tình khúc vượt thời gian
Tỏa sáng bất ngờToàn cảnh 24hBản tin thể thaoCamera 24h (trưa)Cùng lên tiếngCuộc sống thường ngàyDự báo thời tiếtĐộc lạGiải trí 24hGóc nhìn bình luậnGóc nhìn V9Kinh tế kết nốiNâng tầm nông sản Việt
Nhịp cầu đầu tưPhóng sự điều traPhút cảnh báoTạp chí sao
Tiêu điểm mỗi ngày 
Toàn cảnh thị trường
Tôi đẹp
Tôi là Hoa hậu Hoàn vũ Việt Nam
Tôi là nông dân
Tôi là nông dân Việt
Tôi làm được...
Tôi làm ngôi sao
Tôi người Việt Nam 
Tôi tỏa sáng
Tôi yêu biển
Tổ ấm lạ kỳ 
Trai đẹp vào bếp
Tranh tài thể thao
Trầm hương – Văn hóa tâm linh người Việt
Trẻ em luôn đúng
Trên bến dưới thuyền
Trò chuyện sao
Tùy cơ ứng biến 
Tuổi trẻ & sáng tạo
Tư vấn mùa thi
Tư vấn sức khỏe  
Từ biên cương đến hải đảo
Ú òa 
Vàng son muôn thuở
Văn học nghệ thuật
Văn hóa xã hội cuối tuần
Văn minh giao thông
Vấn đề xã hội
Về đất phương Nam
Về miền gió cát
Vị khách bí ẩn
Video yêu thích
Việt Nam danh lam cổ tựViệt Nam LogisticsViệt Nam quê hương tôi
Vitamin Cuời 
Vì bình yên cuộc sống
Vì nền nông nghiệp bền vững
Vì nhân dân quên mình
Vì sức khỏe người tiêu dùng
Video yêu thích Vòng quay lốc xoáyVợ tôi là số 1
VTV9 kết nối
VTV9 – Lan tỏa yêu thương
Vua tóc Việt Nam
Vượt lên số phận
Vượt thời gian
Vươn tới tương lai 
We Will Debut – Dự án Thần tượng
Xả StressXe và phong cáchXem VTV9 trúng quà
Xi nê mê
Xiếc Việt Nam
Xóm chung cư
Xóm trọ nghệ sĩ
Xoay cùng trái bóng
X–Show
Xuân yêu thương
Xúc tiến thương mại
Y khoa hiện đại 
Ý nghĩa của tình yêu
Y tế +
Y tế & sức khỏe

Defunct channels
 VTV6 

2M gặp gỡ
2M Thế giới âm nhạc
12 cá tính lên đường xuyên việt
60 phút mở
1–2–3 hít thở
 360 độ thể thao
Ai thông minh hơn học sinh lớp 5? - Are You Smarter Than A 5th Grader ?  
Bài hát Việt
Bản đồ ẩm thực Việt Nam
Bản tin con cua
Bản tin hài hước 
Bay cùng cánh lạc
Bạn trẻ bốn phương
Bảng xếp hạng âm nhạc Hàn Quốc
Bếp cười
Biển Đông du ký
Biệt đội phong cách 
 Bữa trưa vui vẻ
Bước nhảy xì tin
Cảm nhận Việt Nam
Cảm ơn cuộc đời 
Cận cảnh thể thao
 Cất cánh
Cầu vồng 
Câu lạc bộ 2M 
Chai thủy tinh
Chat với V6 
Chinh phục
Chương trình đột xuất
Chung cư 22+
 Chuyến đi màu xanh
Chuyến xe khởi nghiệp
Chúng ta là 1 gia đình
Có gì mới sáng nay
COVID-19: Phòng và chống (phát lại từ VTV2)
Cuộc chiến nuôi con
 Cuộc đua không dừng lại
Cuộc đua kỳ thú
Cuộc sống vẫn tiếp diễn (phát lại từ VTV1)
Cuộc sống vẫn tươi đẹp
Cư dân thông thái
Dám làm không
 Dám sống
Dịch giả
Dòng thời cuộc
Du lịch khám phá
Dự báo thời tiết
Đại tiệc FA
Đấu trường truyền hình 
Điểm nóng
Đối thoại trẻ
Đũa tre
Đùa chút thôi – Just For Laugh Gags 
Đường lên đỉnh Olympia
Đường tới cầu vồng
Gia đình trẻ
Giờ bom tấn 
Giờ phim thiếu nhi 
 Ghế không tựa
Góc nhìn trẻ
Góc phim thiếu nhi
Góc sáng tạo
Góc thiếu nhi
Gương mặt mới
Gương mặt sinh viên
Hạc giấy 
Hành trình khám phá  
Hành trình tuổi trẻ làm theo lời Bác
Học viện danh hài
Học viện ngôi sao – Star Academy
Hoa khôi áo dài Việt Nam – Đường tới Vương miện Hoa hậu Thế giới
Hội ngộ yêu thương
Hộp nhạc số
Hôm nay ai đến?
Kết nối trẻ
 Khám phá thế giới
 Khám phá Việt Nam
Khám phá truyền hình
Khán giả tự làm
Khi người ta trẻ
Khi tôi 18
Khi trái bóng lăn
 Khoảnh khắc
Ki ốt âm nhạc
Làm cha mẹ
Lăng kính V6
Lính mới tò te
Lựa chọn của tôi
Mảnh ghép tiếng Anh - English Bites
Mbox Ising
Một bước để chiến thắng – Step Right Up
Mở khóa tình yêu
MTV Exit
 Nào cùng phong cách
Ngày mới
Ngày sáng tạoNghiêng 30 độ 5 Ngôi nhà thế hệ sốNgôi nhà thế hệ số – Ông bà tôiNgôi sao ước mơNgôi sao ước mơ – Trò chuyện 20Ngược chiềuNgười được chọnNgười giấu mặt – Big BrotherNgười kế tiếp – Next OneNgười làm nhạcNgười Việt trẻNgười xuyên tườngNhà trònNhật ký người ViệtNhiệt kế thể thao Nhịp đập 360 độ thể thao Nhịp đập thể thao (phát song song với VTV3)Những bài hát còn xanhNhững bông hoa nhỏ (phiên bản mới)Bạn trẻ bốn phươngI got it – Hãy cùng khám pháNhững nốt nhạc xinhTrò chuyện cùng béVạn vật quanh taVườn cổ tíchVừng ơi mở cửa raNhững điều chưa nóiNhững đứa trẻ hay chuyện Những mảnh ghép cuộc sống Những phụ nữ có GuNối mạng ý tưởngNút rec của tôi Phép lạ lòng tốtPhim hoạt hìnhPhim ngắnPhim SitcomPhim trẻ Phim truyệnPhòng mạch Dấu hỏi xanh Quả chuông nhỏQuán cà phê khóa Sol Quân khu số 1Sàn giao dịch ý tưởng Sáng bừng sức sốngSáng tạo học tròSáng tạo khởi nghiệpSân cỏ BundesligaSiêu thủ lĩnhSinh ra từ làngSói nhỏ của tôiSống khácStudio V62Mbox nhạc ViệtChuyên cơ số 6Gara bí mậtMboxXưởng thời trangTạp chí thiếu nhiThành phố đảo ngượcThần tượng âm nhạc Việt Nam Vui cùng Thần tượng âm nhạc 
 Tần số 20Thế hệ tôiThể dục F5Thế giới 2MThế giới 2M – Gặp gỡThế giới ô maiThế giới VM Thế hệ sốThông điệp tuổi 20 Thứ 6 để yêuThực đơn âm nhạcThư giãn cuối tuầnThư viện cuộc sốngThường thứcTình yêu của tôiTìm kiếm tài năng châu Á – Asia Got Talent 
 Tổ quốc trong timTòa tuyên ánTôi chọn nghềTôi dám hátTôi hát – Ising Tôi lên tiếngTôi tài năngTôi thấyTôi yêu Hà NộiTrà chanhTrẻ em luôn đúng Trên từng cây sốTuổi 20 hátTuổi trẻ & Tổ quốcTừ điển hạnh phúcƯớc mơ của béV6 du kýV6 và những người bạn Vân tay Video Storm: Bạn đã xem chưa?Vitamin C VTV Sports NewsVũ điệu xanhVua đầu bếpVươn cao V-StarVừng ơi mở cửa raXưởng thời trangVTV HueBếp ViệtCa nhạc thiếu nhiCamera thứ 8Chào ngày mớiChuyến xe buýt kỳ thúCông nghệ thông tin Cuộc sống quanh taDiễn đàn văn hóa xã hộiDự báo thời tiếtGiao lưu âm nhạc Hộp thư truyền hìnhHuế – tình yêu của tôiKhoa học và cuộc sống Kỹ năng thoát hiểmMở cửa tri thứcNgôi sao mớiNgười nông dân hiện đạiNhững bông hoa nhỏNhững mảnh ghép cuộc sốngNông nghiệp nông thônNông thôn mới Ống kính du lịchPhát hiện từ cơ sởPhiếu bé ngoanTạp chí gia đìnhTạp chí khoa học – xã hội nhân vănThế giới động vật Thế giới trẻ 4NThế giới trẻThời sựTiếp lửa tài năngVăn học nghệ thuậtVì tương lai xanhViệt Nam – đất nước – con ngườiVòng xoáy sự kiệnY học cho mọi nhàÝ tưởng HuếVTV Danang5 phút cùng nghệ sỹ10 phút72 giờ thách thức sức bềnAloringAn ninh Quảng NamẨn số vàngBản tin cuối ngàyBản tin thị trườngBản tin thị trường Miền Trung – Tây NguyênBản tin văn hóa - thể thao thế giớiChìa khóa vàng – BrainTeaserChuyện thường ngàyChuyên đề cuối tuần Chuyên mục lực lượng vũ trang Quân khu 5Chuyên gia & Cuộc sốngChuyện thật như đùaCó thể bạn quan tâmCó lý có tìnhCùng chúng tôi đối thoại Cùng nhau xả StressCười chút chơiCười để ngẫmDự báo thời tiếtDự báo thời tiết du lịchĐằng sau những cung đườngĐịa danh và sự tíchĐố vui để học (Đài Quảng Nam – Đà Nẵng cũ, nay là VTV Đà Nẵng)Gặp nhau để cườiGia đình tài tửGiáo dục và công nghệGiờ của béGóc nhìn cuộc sống Góc nhìn văn hóaHành trình khám pháHộp thư truyền hìnhKhám phá Nam Trung BộKhám phá tự nhiên Khát vọng tuổi xanhKhoa học và giáo dụcKinh tế xã hộiKý sự biển đảoKý sự Côn ĐảoKý sự vùng caoLao động & Việc làmLực lượng vũ trang Quân khu 5Món ngon mỗi ngàyMỗi ngày một câu chuyệnMy IdolMWNét đẹp cuộc sốngNhịp cầu ngày mới Nhịp điệu tuổi thơ Những bí ẩn khoa họcNhững bông hoa nhỏNhững thiên thần nhanh nhạy Phim chiều của bạnPhong cách trẻPhóng sự cuối tuầnSân khấu truyền hìnhSống có chấtSống khỏe sống vuiSức khỏe 365Tạp chí EsportsTạp chí Khoa học nông nghiệpTâm sáng vươn xaTheo chiều dài đất nướcThế giới 7 ngày quaThế giới đó đâyThế giới động vậtThế giới hoang dãThể thao thế giớiThời sự DVTV (Thời sự VTV Đà Nẵng)Tư vấn sức khỏeVăn hóa văn nghệVăn nghệ đời sốngVẻ đẹp tâm hồnVì an ninh tổ quốcViệt Nam, đất nước – con ngườiXúc xắc vui VTV Phú Yên Ấn tượng thể thao 7 ngàyBản tin 11:30Chuyện đời chuyện nghềChuyện từ những cung đườngChương trình tiếng Ê ĐêDân số & phát triểnDân tộc & phát triểnDiễn đàn nông nghiệpDu lịch cuối tuầnDự báo thời tiếtGiai điệu quê hươngGiao hưởng thính phòngHành trình khám pháKết nối trái timKhám phá Nam Trung BộKinh tế Nam Trung BộKhoa học & cuộc sốngNgày mớiQuốc phòng toàn dânSở hữu trí tuệ và cuộc sống Tạp chí thứ 7Tạp chí tuổi thơTheo dòng cảm xúcThế giới cập nhậtThời sự VTV Phú YênThị trường cuối tuầnTiếng nói cử triTin tức 30 giâyTrang bạn gáiViệt Nam mến yêuVì an ninh tổ quốcVũ điệu mãi xanh VTV Cần Thơ 1, VTV Cần Thơ 2 AloringAn toàn giao thôngBạn nhà chăn nuôiBác Ba Phi thời hội nhậpBản tin kinh tế thị trườngCa nhạc theo yêu cầuCảnh đời Chân dung nhà nôngChiếc nón kỳ diệuChiến công và kỷ niệmChính sách pháp luậtChuyện lạ xứ mìnhChuyện ở trường quay Chuyện tôi kểChuyện làng chuyện xómChuyện ở huyệnCùng chúng tôi đối thoại Dân số & gia đìnhDân số & sức khỏe Dự báo thời tiếtĐầu tư 24/7Đấu giá may mắnĐấu trường 100Địa danh và sự tích Đồng hành và Chia sẻHạt ngọc mùa vàngHành trình cây lúa khỏe Hành trình văn hóa  Hành trình vì Khát vọng ViệtHòa điệu đất Chín RồngHộp thư công dânKết nối saoKhắc nhập khắc xuấtKhuyến nôngKim tự thápKý sự truyền hìnhKý ức Miền TâyLive Music Lực lượng vũ trang Quân khu 9Măng non mọc thẳngMẹo hay thường ngàyMiền Tây ngày mớiMua sắm cuối tuầnNhà nông & chuyên giaNhịp cầu nhà nôngNhịp sống trái tim Những bông hoa nhỏNhững lời yêu thươngNhững thước phim đi cùng năm thángNông thôn ngày nayNốt nhạc vuiNụ cười vàngÔ chữ vàng – BrainTeaserPháp luật & chính sách Phim truyện nước ngoài Phim tài liệuPhim truyện Việt Nam Quốc phòng toàn dân Quân khu 9Sản phẩm của bạnSea ShowSức sống MekongTạp chí du lịch Tạp chí công đoànTạp chí kinh tế Đồng bằng Sông Cửu LongTạp chí thanh niênTâm tình nghệ sĩThần tượng âm nhạc Việt NamThầy thuốc gia đìnhThầy thuốc với mọi nhà Thế giới Xì tinThêm niềm mơ ướcThông tin kinh tếThông tin nông nghiệpThời sự khu vựcThời sự khu vực cuối ngàyThời sự khu vực tổng hợpThời tiết nông vụThử thách cùng bước nhảy Tiếng tơ đồngToàn cảnh ĐBSCLTrò chuyện cuối tuầnTừ quê ra thànhTừ văn học ra màn ảnhÚm ba la ra chữUng thư và những phương pháp điều trị mới Vì an ninh tổ quốcVì cuộc sống Vui lạ đó đây New Year programs Thời sự đặc biệtGặp nhau cuối nămTự hào Thể thao Việt Nam Vạn xuânTết nghĩa là hy vọngKhông khí đón giao thừaChào cờ, Lời chúc Tết của Chủ tịch nướcBản tin thời sự đặc biệt (sau giao thừa Âm lịch)Mùa đoàn tụ
Bừng sáng Việt NamCảm hứng bất tậnCâu chuyện cuối năm
Chào Xuân
Chuyện cuối năm
Chuyện kể chiều 30
Đêm cuối năm
Đón tết ở xa xứ
Đồng dao cánh én
Lịch vạn xuân - Những năm Dần đăc biệt trong lịch sử
Quê hương mùa đoàn tụ
Tết ánh dương 
Thơ Xuân
Trò chuyện đầu xuân12 con giápAlo tết
Ăn tết Việt
Bản tin thời sự đặc biệt đón giao thừa (sau giao thừa dương lịch)Bản tin 21h đặc biệt (VTV4) 
Bản tin tổng hợp đón năm mớiBuổi sáng đầu tiên Bước nhảy mùa xuân 
Cà phê tếtCâu chuyện đầu nămCảm ơn cuộc đờiChúc XuânChiều cuối nămDấu ấn Dấu ấn ngoại giaoDu ca Điều ước thứ 7Du XuânĐại hội Táo Quân (VTV9)
Đào mai tương ngộĐón Tết cùng VTV 
Điểm tựa của bình yênĐón mùa mới sangGala Cặp lá yêu thươngGala Cuộc sống vẫn tươi đẹpGala cườiGala Hành trình hạnh phúcGala sân khấu truyền thốngGala Tết Việt
Gala Tinh hoa võ thuậtGala Việc tử tế 
Gặp gỡ các gia đình nghệ sĩ đầu xuânGặp gỡ diễn viên truyền hình 
Gặp gỡ mùa xuân
Gặp gỡ VTV (2013 - 2015) Hành trình của hạnh phúcHoa xuân caHòa ca'Hồn ViệtHương tết Việt (VTV9)Khát vọng thịnh vượngKhoảnh khắc mùa xuân
Năm Mão nói chuyện mèo (1999)Nối vòng tay lớnHướng tới Nối vòng tay lớnMùa xuân mơ ướcMừng tuổi đầu năm - Cái tết của mèo conMừng tuổi đầu xuân 
Những năm Ngọ vẻ vang trong lịch sử (2002)
Nhà hát những giấc mơNồng nàn vị tếtNụ cười xuân (VTV9)
Nụ cười xuân 99 (VTV3)Ngày trở vềPhiên chợ mùa xuânSắc xuân Việt Nam
Tạp chí kinh tế cuối năm
Tạp chí kinh tế đặc biệt
Tạp chí kinh tế năm Giáp Ngọ / Ất MùiTạp chí xuân: Sức sống đồng bằng (VTV Cần Thơ)Tết Đồ Rê Mí (VTV3)
Tết Hòa ca nhí
Tết cho người nghèoTết với đồng bàoThể thao xuânThông tin 260 – Doanh nghiệp chúc mừng năm mớiTiếng xuân
Tiểu phẩm hài Toàn cảnh báo xuânVẻ đẹp ViệtVTV - Những giai điệu đẹpVũ khúc ánh sáng
Xuân đoàn viênXuân về trong trái tim đồng bào 
Thành tựu Thể Thao Việt Nam
Tạp chí xuân
Khát vọng xuân

Others

 Event Sports 
Accompanying/sideline programs in major regional and global sporting events include:

24 huyền thoại bóng đáẤn tượng FIFA World Cup/EuroBình luận trước, giữa & sau trận đấu (FIFA World Cup, Euro, SEA Games,...)Cận cảnh Olympic 2020
Chuyển động EuroCon số UEFA EuroDấu ấn FIFA World Cup/Euro/SEA GamesDự đoán kết quả AFFCup/Seagames/World Cup...
Đấu giá vận may Euro
Điểm nóng FIFA World CupĐường tới FIFA World Cup/Euro/....Euro & những con số
Giờ vàng Euro (2008)
Góc người hâm mộ
Khám phá hành trình UEFA European ChampionshipKhoảnh khắc FIFA World Cup/UEFA European Championship/Olympic/SEA Games...Khởi động cùng World Cup (2002)
Lăn cùng trái bóng Euro
Ngôi sao cúp Thế giới
Ngôi sao EuroNhật ký FIFA World Cup/Euro/AFF Suzuki Cup/SEA GamesNhịp đập thể thao / 360° thể thao cùng Euro, FIFA World Cup, Olympic, SEA Games....Niềm hy vọng vàng (SEA Games 22)Nóng cùng FIFA World Cup/UEFA European Championship...Những bàn thắng đẹp (Premier League)Rap EuroSân cỏ SEA GamesSôi động Euro/FIFA World Cup/SEA Games...Sảng khoái cùng SEA Games 22 
Sắc màu Euro/World Cup/SEA GamesSôi động bóng đá thế giớiSôi động cùng Olympic
Thông tin trước vòng đấu (Ngoại hạng Anh)
Thử tài Euro
Tin nhanh thế vận hội (2008)Toàn cảnh FIFA World Cup/Euro/SEA Games...Tôi yêu World Cup
Từ điển World CupTường thuật bóng đá (phát lại các trận đấu....) (VTV4)World Cup của nghệ sĩ
World Cup của tôi 
Xem Euro cùng người nổi tiếng
Đồng hành cùng Cúp vô địch thế giới

Promotional programs  

1 phút với VTV3
Khoảnh khắc VTV3
Vòng quay VTV3Bạn có tin nhắn mớiChào.VTVĐiểm nhấn cuối tuần (VTV3)
Đừng bỏ lỡ (VTV3)
Giới thiệu phim Việt Nam 20h (VTV1)Hẹn với VTV2Lên hình
Nhiệt kế VTV6Nhịp sống VTV3Phim tháng (VTV1)
Siêu thị phim
Tháng tới xem gì? (VTV3)
Thực đơn tuần mới (VTV6)VTV kết nối'''VTV kết nối OnlineVTV6 bật mí''

See also 
List of television programme broadcast by HTV
List of television programmes broadcast by Vinh Long TV (THVL)
List of programmes broadcast by Hanoi Radio Television
List of programme broadcast by Vietnam Television paytv
List of programmes broadcast by VTC
Vietnam Television
 List of television programmes
 List of animated television series
 List of comedy television series
 List of international game shows
 List of science fiction television programs
 List of television spin-offs

References

Vietnam Television original programming
Vietnam
Original programming by Vietnamese television network or channel
Vietnamese television series